Latin America is a cultural concept denoting the Americas where Romance languages—languages derived from Latin—are predominantly spoken. The term was coined in the nineteenth century, to refer to regions in the Americas that were ruled by the Spanish, Portuguese and French empires. The term does not have a precise definition, but it is "commonly used to describe South America, Central America, Mexico, and the islands of the Caribbean."  In a narrow sense, it refers to Spanish America and Brazil (Portuguese America). The term "Latin America" is broader than categories such as Hispanic America, which specifically refers to Spanish-speaking countries; and Ibero-America, a term not generally used that specifically refers to both Spanish and Portuguese-speaking countries while leaving French and British excolonies aside.

The term Latin America was first used in an 1856 conference called "Initiative of America: Idea for a Federal Congress of the Republics" (Iniciativa de la América. Idea de un Congreso Federal de las Repúblicas), by the Chilean politician Francisco Bilbao.

The region covers an area that stretches from Mexico to Tierra del Fuego and includes much of the Caribbean. It has an area of approximately 19,197,000 km (7,412,000 sq mi), almost 13% of the Earth's land surface area. As of March 2, 2020, the population of Latin America and the Caribbean was estimated at more than 652 million, and in 2019, Latin America had a combined nominal GDP of US$5,188,250 trillion and a GDP PPP of US$10,284,588 trillion.

Etymology and definitions

Origins
 
There is no universal agreement on the origin of the term Latin America. The concept and term came into being in the nineteenth century, following the political independence of countries from the Spanish and Portuguese empires. It was also popularized in 1860s France during the reign of Napoleon III. The term Latin America was a part of its attempt to create a French empire in the Americas. Research has shown that the idea that a part of the Americas has a linguistic and cultural affinity with the Romance cultures as a whole can be traced back to the 1830s, in the writing of the French Saint-Simonian Michel Chevalier, who postulated that a part of the Americas was inhabited by people of a "Latin race", and that it could, therefore, ally itself with "Latin Europe", ultimately overlapping the Latin Church, in a struggle with "Teutonic Europe," "Anglo-Saxon America," and "Slavic Europe."

Historian John Leddy Phelan located the origins of the term Latin America to be from the French occupation of Mexico. His argument is that French imperialists used the concept of "Latin" America as a way to counter British imperialism, as well as to challenge the German threat to France. The idea of a "Latin race" was then taken up by Latin American intellectuals and political leaders of the mid- and late-nineteenth century, who no longer looked to Spain or Portugal as cultural models, but rather to France. French ruler Napoleon III had a strong interest in extending French commercial and political power in the region. He and his business promoter Felix Belly called it "Latin America" to emphasize the shared Latin background of France with the former viceroyalties of Spain and colonies of Portugal. This led to Napoleon III's failed attempt to take military control of Mexico in the 1860s.

However, though Phelan's thesis is still frequently cited in US academy, further scholarship has shown earlier usage of the term. Two Latin American historians, Uruguayan Arturo Ardao and Chilean Miguel Rojas Mix, found evidence that the term "Latin America" was used earlier than Phelan claimed, and the first use of the term was in fact in opposition to imperialist projects in the Americas. Ardao wrote about this subject in his book Génesis de la idea y el nombre de América latina (Genesis of the Idea and the Name of Latin America, 1980), and Miguel Rojas Mix in his article "Bilbao y el hallazgo de América latina: Unión continental, socialista y libertaria" (Bilbao and the Finding of Latin America: a Continental, Socialist and Libertarian Union, 1986). As Michel Gobat points out in his article "The Invention of Latin America: A Transnational History of Anti-Imperialism, Democracy, and Race", "Arturo Ardao, Miguel Rojas Mix, and Aims McGuinness have revealed [that] the term 'Latin America' had already been used in 1856 by Central Americans and South Americans protesting US expansion into the Southern Hemisphere". Edward Shawcross summarizes Ardao's and Rojas Mix's findings in the following way: "Ardao identified the term in a poem by a Colombian diplomat and intellectual resident in France, José María Torres Caicedo, published on 15 February 1857 in a French based Spanish-language newspaper, while Rojas Mix located it in a speech delivered in France by the radical liberal Chilean politician Francisco Bilbao in June 1856".

The words "Latin" and "America" were first found to be combined in a printed work to produce the term "Latin America" in 1856 in a conference by the Chilean politician Francisco Bilbao in Paris. The conference had the title "Initiative of the America. Idea for a Federal Congress of Republics." The following year, Colombian writer José María Torres Caicedo also used the term in his poem "The Two Americas". Two events related with the United States played a central role in both works. The first event happened less than a decade before the publication of Bilbao's and Torres Caicedo's works: the Invasion of Mexico or, in USA, the Mexican–American War, after which Mexico lost a third of its territory. The second event, the Walker affair, which happened the same year that both works were written: the decision by US president Franklin Pierce to recognize the regime recently established in Nicaragua by American William Walker and his band of filibusters who ruled Nicaragua for nearly a year (1856–57) and attempted to reinstate slavery there, where it had been already abolished for three decades

In both Bilbao's and Torres Caicedo's works, the Mexican–American War (1846–48) and William Walker's expedition to Nicaragua are explicitly mentioned as examples of dangers for the region. For Bilbao, "Latin America" was not a geographical concept, as he excluded Brazil, Paraguay, and Mexico. Both authors also asked for the union of all Latin American countries as the only way to defend their territories against further foreign US interventions. Both also rejected European imperialism, claiming that the return of European countries to non-democratic forms of government was another danger for Latin American countries, and used the same word to describe the state of European politics at the time: "despotism." Several years later, during the French invasion of Mexico, Bilbao wrote another work, "Emancipation of the Spirit in America," where he asked all Latin American countries to support the Mexican cause against France, and rejected French imperialism in Asia, Africa, Europe and the Americas. He asked Latin American intellectuals to search for their "intellectual emancipation" by abandoning all French ideas, claiming that France was: "Hypocrite, because she [France] calls herself protector of the Latin race just to subject it to her exploitation regime; treacherous, because she speaks of freedom and nationality, when, unable to conquer freedom for herself, she enslaves others instead!" Therefore, as Michel Gobat puts it, the term Latin America itself had an "anti-imperial genesis," and their creators were far from supporting any form of imperialism in the region, or in any other place of the globe.

In France, the term Latin America was used with the opposite intention. It was employed by the French Empire of Napoleon III during the French invasion of Mexico as a way to include France among countries with influence in the Americas and to exclude Anglophone countries. It played a role in his campaign to imply cultural kinship of the region with France, transform France into a cultural and political leader of the area, and install Maximilian of Habsburg as emperor of the Second Mexican Empire. The term was also used in 1861 by French scholars in La revue des races Latines, a magazine dedicated to the Pan-Latinism movement.

Contemporary definitions 

 Latin America is often used synonymously with Ibero-America ("Iberian America"), where the populations speak Spanish or Portuguese and the dominant religion is Roman Catholic. This definition excludes the predominantly Protestant English- and Dutch-speaking regions, as well as French-speaking predominantly Catholic regions. Belize, Guyana and Suriname, as well as several French overseas departments, are excluded from the definition. Puerto Rico, the Spanish-speaking Caribbean territory of the U.S., acquired from the Spanish Empire following its defeat in the 1898 Spanish American War, is then usually included. 
 In another definition, which is close to the semantic origin, Latin America designates the set of countries in the Americas where a Romance language (a language derived from Latin) predominates: Spanish, Portuguese, French, or a creole language based upon the three. Thus, it includes Mexico; most of Central and South America; and in the Caribbean, Cuba, the Dominican Republic, and Haiti. Latin America then comprises all of the countries in the Americas that were once part of the Spanish, Portuguese, and French Empires. Puerto Rico, although not a sovereign nation, is often included.
 The term is sometimes used more broadly to refer to all of the Americas south of the United States, thus including the Guianas (French Guiana, Guyana, and Suriname); the Anglophone Caribbean (and Belize); the Francophone Caribbean; and the Dutch Caribbean. This definition emphasizes a similar socioeconomic history of the region, which was characterized by formal or informal colonialism, rather than cultural aspects (see, for example, dependency theory). Some sources avoid this simplification by using the alternative phrase "Latin America and the Caribbean", as in the United Nations geoscheme for the Americas. A number of academic area-studies programs and centers of Latin American studies are titled "Latin American and Caribbean" studies, such as the Center for Latin American and Caribbean Studies, University of Michigan, New York University  Center for Latin American and Caribbean Studies (CLACS), and University of Washington's Latin American and Caribbean Studies, The Henry M. Jackson School of International Studies.  Although the U.S. acquired a large swath of territory from the Spanish Empire and called Spanish borderlands and nearly 20% of the U.S. population identifies as "Hispanic" (or "Latinx"), the U.S. is generally not classified as being part of Latin America. However, the significant demographic is sometimes brought under the umbrella of Latin American studies, such as at University of Albany.

The distinction between Latin America and Anglo-America is a convention based on the predominant languages in the Americas by which Romance language- and English-speaking cultures are distinguished. Neither area is culturally or linguistically homogeneous; in substantial portions of Latin America (e.g., highland Peru, Bolivia, Mexico, Guatemala), Native American cultures and, to a lesser extent, Amerindian languages, are predominant, and in other areas, the influence of African cultures is strong (e.g., the Caribbean basinincluding parts of Colombia and Venezuela).

The term's meaning is contested and not without controversy. Historian Mauricio Tenorio-Trillo explores at length the "allure and power" of the idea of Latin America. He remarks at the outset, "The idea of 'Latin America' ought to have vanished with the obsolescence of racial theory... But it is not easy to declare something dead when it can hardly be said to have existed," going on to say, "The term is here to stay, and it is important." Following in the tradition of Chilean writer Francisco Bilbao, who excluded Brazil, Argentina and Paraguay from his early conceptualization of Latin America, Chilean historian Jaime Eyzaguirre has criticized the term Latin America for "disguising" and "diluting" the Spanish character of a region (i.e. Hispanic America) with the inclusion of nations that, according to him, do not share the same pattern of conquest and colonization.

The Francophone part of North America which includes Quebec and Acadia is generally excluded from the definition of Latin America.

Subregions and countries

Latin America can be subdivided into several subregions based on geography, politics, demographics and culture. It is defined as all of the Americas south of the United States, the basic geographical subregions are North America, Central America, the Caribbean and South America; the latter contains further politico-geographical subdivisions such as the Southern Cone, The Guianas and the Andean states. It may be subdivided on linguistic grounds into Spanish America, Portuguese America, and French America.

*: Not a sovereign state

History

Before European contact in 1492

 

The earliest known human settlement in the area was identified at Monte Verde, near Puerto Montt in southern Chile. Its occupation dates to some 14,000 years ago and there is disputed evidence of even earlier occupation. Over the course of millennia, people spread to all parts of the North and South America and the Caribbean islands. Although the region now known as Latin America stretches from northern Mexico to Tierra del Fuego, the diversity of its geography, topography, climate, and cultivable land means that populations were not evenly distributed. Sedentary populations of fixed settlements supported by agriculture gave rise to complex civilizations in Mesoamerica (central and southern Mexico and Central America) and the highland Andes populations of Quechua and Aymara, as well as Chibcha.

Agricultural surpluses from intensive cultivation of maize in Mesoamerica and potatoes and hardy grains in the Andes were able to support distant populations beyond farmers' households and communities. Surpluses allowed the creation of social, political, religious, and military hierarchies, urbanization with stable village settlements and major cities, specialization of craft work, and the transfer of products via tribute and trade. In the Andes, llamas were domesticated and used to transport goods; Mesoamerica had no large domesticated animals to aid human labor or provide meat. Mesoamerican civilizations developed systems of writing; in the Andes, knotted quipus emerged as a system of accounting.

The Caribbean region had sedentary populations settled by Arawak or Tainos and in what is now Brazil, many Tupian peoples lived in fixed settlements. Semi-sedentary populations had agriculture and settled villages, but soil exhaustion required relocation of settlements. Populations were less dense and social and political hierarchies less institutionalized. Non-sedentary peoples lived in small bands, with low population density and without agriculture. They lived in harsh environments. By the first millennium CE, the Western Hemisphere was the home of tens of millions of people; the exact numbers are a source of ongoing research and controversy.

The last two great civilizations, the Aztecs and Incas, emerged into prominence in the early fourteenth century and mid-fifteenth centuries. Although the Indigenous empires were conquered by Europeans, the sub-imperial organization of the densely populated regions remained in place. The presence or absence of Indigenous populations had an impact on how European imperialism played out in the Americas. The pre-Columbian civilizations of Mesoamerica and the highland Andes became sources of pride for American-born Spaniards in the late colonial era and for nationalists in the post-independence era. For some modern Latin American nation-states, the Indigenous roots of national identity are expressed in the ideology of indigenismo. These modern constructions of national identity usually critique their colonial past.

Colonial era, 1492-1825

Spanish and Portuguese colonization of the Western Hemisphere laid the basis for societies now seen as characteristic of Latin America. In the fifteenth century, both Portugal and Spain embarked on voyages of overseas exploration, following the Christian Reconquista of Iberia from Muslims. Portugal sailed down the west coast of Africa and the Crown of Castile in central Spain authorized the voyage of Genoese mariner Christopher Columbus. Portugal's maritime expansion into the Indian Ocean was initially its main interest; but the off-course voyage of Pedro Álvares Cabral in 1500 allowed Portugal to claim Brazil. The 1494 line of demarcation between Spain and Portugal gave Spain all areas to the west, and Portugal all areas to the east. For Portugal, the riches of Africa, India, and the Spice Islands were far more important initially than the unknown territory of Brazil. By contrast, having no better prospects, the Spanish crown directed its energies to its New World territories. Spanish colonists began founding permanent settlements in the circum-Caribbean region, starting in 1493. In these regions of early contact, Spaniards established patterns of interaction with Indigenous peoples that they transferred to the mainland. At the time of European contact, the area was densely populated by Indigenous peoples who had not organized as empires, nor created large physical complexes. With the expedition of Hernán Cortés from Cuba to Mexico in 1519, Spaniards encountered the Indigenous imperial civilization of the Aztecs. Using techniques of warfare honed in their early Caribbean settlements, Cortés sought Indigenous allies to topple the superstructure of the Aztec Empire after a two-year war of conquest. The Spanish recognized many Indigenous elites as nobles under Spanish rule with continued power and influence over commoners, and used them as intermediaries in the emerging Spanish imperial system.

With the example of the conquest of central Mexico, Spaniards sought similar great empires to conquer, and expanded into other regions of Mexico and Central America, and then the Inca empire, by Francisco Pizarro. By the end of the sixteenth century Spain and Portugal claimed territory extending from Alaska to the southern tip of Patagonia. They founded cities that remain important centers. In Spanish America, these include Panama City (1519), Mexico City (1521) Guadalajara (1531–42), Cartagena (1532), Cuzco (1534), Lima (1535), and Quito (1534). 
In Brazil, coastal cities were founded: Olinda (1537), Salvador de Bahia (1549), São Paulo (1554), and Rio de Janeiro (1565). 

Spaniards explored extensively in the mainland territories they claimed, but they settled in great numbers in areas with dense and hierarchically organized Indigenous populations and exploitable resources, especially silver. Early Spanish conquerors saw the Indigenous themselves as an exploitable resource for tribute and labor, and individual Spaniards were awarded grants of encomienda forced labor as reward for participation in the conquest. Throughout most of Spanish America, Indigenous populations were the largest component, with some black slaves serving in auxiliary positions. The three main racial groups during the colonial era were European whites, black Africans, and Indigenous. Over time, these populations intermixed, resulting in castas. In most of Spanish America, the Indigenous were the majority population.

Both dense Indigenous populations and silver were found in New Spain (colonial Mexico) and Peru, and the now-countries became centers of the Spanish empire. The Viceroyalty of New Spain, centered in Mexico City, was established in 1535 and the Viceroyalty of Peru, centered in Lima, in 1542. The Viceroyalty of New Spain also had jurisdiction over the Spanish East Indies, once the Spanish established themselves there in the late sixteenth century. The viceroy was the direct representative of the king.

The Roman Catholic Church, as an institution, launched a "spiritual conquest" to convert Indigenous populations to Christianity, incorporating them into Christendom, with no other religion permitted. Pope Alexander VI in 1493 had bestowed on the Catholic Monarchs great power over ecclesiastical appointments and the functioning of the church in overseas possessions. The monarch was the patron of the institutional church. The state and the Catholic church were the institutional pillars of Spanish colonial rule. In the late eighteenth century, the crown also established a royal military to defend its possessions against foreign incursions, especially by the British. It also increased the number of viceroyalties in Spanish South America.

Portugal did not establish firm institutional rule in Brazil until the 1530s, but it paralleled many patterns of colonization in Spanish America. The Brazilian Indigenous peoples were initially dense, but were semi-sedentary and lacked the organization that allowed Spaniards to more easily incorporate the Indigenous into the colonial order. The Portuguese used Indigenous laborers to extract the valuable commodity known as brazilwood, which gave its name to the colony. Portugal took greater control of the region to prevent other European powers, particularly France, from threatening its claims.

Europeans sought wealth in the form of high-value, low-bulk products exported to Europe. The Spanish Empire established institutions to secure wealth for itself and protect its empire in the Americas from rivals. In trade it followed principles of mercantilism, where its overseas possessions were to enrich the center of power in Iberia. Trade was regulated through the royal House of Trade in Seville, Spain, with the main export from Spanish America to Spain being silver, later followed by the red dye cochineal. Silver was found in the Andes, in particular the silver mountain of Potosí, (now in Bolivia) in the region where Indigenous men were forced to labor in the mines. In New Spain, rich deposits of silver were found in northern Mexico, in Zacatecas and Guanajuato, outside areas of dense Indigenous settlement. Labor was attracted from elsewhere for mining and landed estates were established to raise wheat, range cattle and sheep. Mules were bred for transportation and to replace of human labor in refining silver. 

In Brazil and some Spanish Caribbean islands, plantations for sugar cultivation developed on a large scale for the export market. For Brazil, the development of the plantation complex transformed the colony from a backwater of the Portuguese empire to a major asset. The Portuguese transported enslaved laborers from their African territories and the seventeenth-century "age of sugar" was transformational, seeing Brazil becoming a major economic component of the Portuguese empire. The population increase exponentially, with the majority being enslaved Africans.  Settlement and economic development was largely coastal, the goal of sugar export to European markets. With competition from other sugar producers, Brazil's fortunes based on sugar declined, but in the eighteenth century, diamonds and gold were found in the southern interior, fueling a new wave of economic activity.  As the economic center of the colony shifted from the sugar-producing northeast to the southern region of gold and diamond mines, the capital was transferred from Salvador de Bahia to Rio de Janeiro in 1763. During the colonial era, Brazil was also the manufacturing center for Portugal's ships. As a global maritime empire, Portugal created a vital industry in Brazil. Once Brazil achieved its independence, this industry languished.

In Spanish America, manufactured and luxury goods were sent from Spain and entered Spanish America legally only through the Caribbean ports of Veracruz, Havana, and Cartagena, as well as the Pacific port of Callao, in Peru. Trans-Pacific trade was established in the late sixteenth century from Acapulco to the Philippines via the Manila Galleon, transporting silver from Mexico and Peru to Asia; Chinese silks and porcelains were sent first to Mexico and then re-exported to Spain. This system of commerce was in theory was tightly controlled, but was increasingly undermined by other European powers. The English, French, and Dutch seized Caribbean islands claimed by the Spanish and established their own sugar plantations. The islands also became hubs for contraband trade with Spanish America. Many regions of Spanish America that were not well supplied by Spanish merchants, such as Central America, participated in contraband trade with foreign merchants. The eighteenth-century Bourbon reforms sought to modernize the mercantile system to stimulate greater trade exchanges between Spain and Spanish America in a system known as comercio libre. It was not free trade in the modern sense, but rather free commerce within the Spanish empire. Liberalization of trade and limited deregulation sought to break the monopoly of merchants based in the Spanish port of Cádiz. Administrative reforms created the system of districts known as intendancies, modeled on those in France. Their creation was aimed at strengthening crown control over its possessions and sparking economic development.

Both Spain and Portugal restricted foreign powers from trading in their American colonies or entering coastal waters it had claimed. Other European powers challenged the exclusive rights claimed by the Iberian powers. The English, Dutch, and French permanently seized islands in the Caribbean and created sugar plantations on the model developed in Brazil. In Brazil, the Dutch seized the sugar-producing area of the northeast, but after 30 years they were expelled.

Colonial legacies

More than three centuries of direct Spanish and Portuguese colonial rule left lasting imprints on Latin America. Spanish and Portuguese are the dominant languages of the region, and Roman Catholicism is the dominant religion. Diseases to which Indigenous peoples had no immunity devastated their populations, although populations still exist in many places. The forced transportation of African slaves transformed major regions where they labored to produce the export products, especially sugar. In regions with dense Indigenous populations, they remained the largest percentage of the population; sugar-producing regions had the largest percentage of blacks. European whites in both Spanish America and Brazil were a small percentage of the population, but they were also the wealthiest and most socially elite; and the racial hierarchies they established in the colonial era have persisted. Cities founded by Europeans in the colonial era remain major centers of power. In the modern era, Latin American governments have worked to designate many colonial cities as UNESCO World Heritage Sites. Exports of metals and agricultural products to Europe dominate Latin American economies, with the manufacturing sector deliberately suppressed; the development of modern, industrial economies of Europe depended on the underdevelopment of Latin America.

Despite the many commonalities of colonial Spanish America and Brazil, they did not think of themselves as being part of a particular region; that was a development of the post-independence period beginning in the nineteenth century. The imprint of Christopher Columbus and Iberian colonialism in Latin America began shifting in the twentieth century. "Discovery" by Europeans was reframed as "encounter" between the Old World and the New. An example of the new consciousness was the dismantling of the Christopher Columbus monument in Buenos Aires, one of many in the hemisphere, mandated by leftist President Cristina Fernández de Kirchner. Its replacement was a statue to a mestiza fighter for independence, Juana Azurduy de Padilla, provoking a major controversy in Argentina over historical and national identity.

Independence era (1776–1825)

Independence in the Americas was not inevitable or uniform in the Americas. Events in Europe had a profound impact on the colonial empires of Spain, Portugal, and France in the Americas. France and Spain had supported the American Revolution that saw the independence of the Thirteen Colonies from Britain, which had defeated them in the Seven Years' War (1757–63). The outbreak of the French Revolution in 1789, a political and social uprising toppling the Bourbon monarchy and overturning the established order, precipitated events in France's rich Caribbean sugar colony of Saint-Domingue, whose black population rose up, led by Toussaint L'ouverture. The Haitian Revolution had far-reaching consequences. Britain declared war on France and attacked ports in Saint-Domingue. Haiti gained independence in 1804, led by ex-slave Jean-Jacques Dessalines following many years of violent struggle, with huge atrocities on both sides. Haitian independence affected colonial empires in the Americas, as well as the United States. Many white, slave-owning sugar planters of Saint-Domingue fled to the Spanish island of Cuba, where they established sugar plantations that became the basis of Cuba's economy. Uniquely in the hemisphere, the black victors in Haiti abolished slavery at independence. Many thousands of remaining whites were executed on the orders of Dessalines. For other regions with large enslaved populations, the Haitian Revolution was a cautionary tale for the white slave-owning planters. Despite Spain and Britain's satisfaction with France's defeat, they "were obsessed by the possible impact of the slave uprising on Cuba, Santo Domingo, and Jamaica", by then a British sugar colony. US President Thomas Jefferson, a wealthy slave owner, refused to recognize Haiti's independence. Recognition only came in 1862 from President Abraham Lincoln. Given France's failure to defeat the slave insurgency and since needing money for the war with Britain, Napoleon Bonaparte sold France's remaining mainland holdings in North America to the United States in the 1803 Louisiana Purchase.

Napoleon's invasion of the Iberian peninsula in 1807-1808 was a major change in the world order, with the stability of both the metropoles and their overseas possessions upended. It resulted in the movement, with British help, of the Portuguese royal court to Brazil, its richest colony. In Spain, France forced abdication of the Spanish Bourbon monarchs and their replacement with Napoleon's brother Joseph Bonaparte as king. The period from 1808 to the restoration in 1814 of the Bourbon monarchy saw new political experiments. In Spanish America, the question of the legitimacy of the new foreign monarch's right to rule set off fierce debate and in many regions to wars of independence. The conflicts were regional and usually quite complex. Chronologically, the Spanish American independence wars were the conquest in reverse, with the areas most recently incorporated into the Spanish empire, such as Argentina and Chile, becoming the first to achieve independence, while the colonial strongholds of Mexico and Peru were the last to achieve independence in the early nineteenth century. Cuba and Puerto Rico, both old Caribbean sugar-producing areas, were not detached from Spain until the 1898 Spanish–American War, with US intervention. 

In Spain, a bloody war against the French invaders broke out and regional juntas were established to rule in the name of the deposed Bourbon king, Ferdinand VII. In Spanish America, local juntas also rejected Napoleon's brother as their monarch. Spanish Liberals re-imagined the Spanish Empire as equally being Iberia and the overseas territories. Liberals sought a new model of government, a constitutional monarchy, with limits on the power of the king as well as on the Catholic Church. Ruling in the name of the deposed Bourbon monarch Ferdinand VII, representatives of the Spanish empire, both from the peninsula and Spanish America, convened a convention in the port of Cadiz. For Spanish American elites who had been shut out of official positions in the late eighteenth century in favor of peninsular-born appointees, this was a major recognition of their role in the empire. These empire-wide representatives drafted and ratified the Spanish Constitution of 1812, establishing a constitutional monarchy and set down other rules of governance, including citizenship and limitations on the Catholic Church. Constitutional rule was a break from absolutist monarchy and gave Spanish America a starting point for constitutional governance. So long as Napoleon controlled Spain, the liberal constitution was the governing document.

When Napoleon was defeated and the Bourbon monarchy was restored in 1814, Ferdinand VII and his conservative supporters immediately reasserted absolutist monarchy, ending the liberal interregnum. In Spanish America, it set off a new wave of struggles for independence.
 
In South America, Simón Bolívar of Venezuela, José de San Martín of Argentina, and Bernardo O'Higgins in Chile led armies who fought for independence. In Mexico, which had seen the initial insurgency led by Hidalgo and José María Morelos, royalist forces maintained control. In 1820, when military officers in Spain restored the liberal Constitution of 1812, conservatives in Mexico saw independence as a better option. Royalist military officer Agustín de Iturbide changed sides and forged an alliance with insurgent leader Vicente Guerrero, and together they brought about Mexico's independence in 1821.

For Portugal and Brazil, Napoleon's defeat did not immediately result in the return of the Portuguese monarch to Portugal, as Brazil was the richest part of the Portuguese empire. As with Spain in 1820, Portuguese liberals threatened the power of the monarchy and compelled John VI to return in April 1821, leaving his son Pedro to rule Brazil as regent. In Brazil, Pedro contended with revolutionaries and insubordination by Portuguese troops, all of whom he subdued. The Portuguese government threatened to revoke the political autonomy that Brazil had enjoyed since 1808, provoking widespread opposition in Brazil. Pedro declared Brazil's independence from Portugal on 7 September 1822 and became emperor. By March 1824 he had defeated all armies loyal to Portugal. Brazil's independence was achieved relatively peaceably, territorial integrity was maintained, and its ruler was from the Royal House of Braganza, whose successors ruled Brazil until their overthrow in 1889.

Early Post-Independence, ca. 1825–1879

After independence Spanish America and Brazil differed in their forms of state rule, with most of Spanish America becoming federated republics (with the exceptions of Cuba and Puerto Rico, which remained Spanish colonies), and Brazil becoming a monarchy ruled by the Brazilian branch of the Portuguese royal family. Spanish America's fragmentation into republics with weakened state structures meant that political turmoil and violence on many levels was a characteristic of the era throughout the region.  Brazil's monarchy was a stabilizing political force and the territorial integrity of the Portuguese colony carried over into the post-independence era.

Although much of Latin America gained its independence in the early nineteenth century, formal recognition by their former metropolitan powers in Spain and Portugal did not come immediately. Portugal officially recognized Brazil on August 29, 1825. The Spanish crown did not recognize new Spanish American nations' independence and sent expeditions to Mexico in failed attempts to regain control over its valuable former territory. Spain finally recognized Mexico's independence in 1836, 15 years after it was achieved. Its recognition of Ecuador's independence came in 1840 and Paraguay's as late as 1880. The new independent territories exerted their rights to establish a government, control their national territory, establish trade relations with other nations, and levy taxes. Brazil and Mexico both established independent monarchies in 1822. Mexico's was short-lived (1822–23) under leader of the independence movement General Iturbide, who was elected constitutional emperor 19 May 1822 and forced to abdicate 19 March 1823. Iturbide had no royal pedigree, so as a commoner he had no prestige or permanent legitimacy as ruler. Brazil's monarchy, a branch of the House of Braganza, lasted until 1889. Spanish America fragmented into various regions.

As a consequence of the violent struggles for independence in most of Spanish America, the military grew in importance. In the post-independence period, it often played a key role in politics. Military leaders often became the initial heads of state, but regional strongmen, or caudillos, also emerged. The first half of the nineteenth century is sometimes characterized as the "age of caudillos." In Argentina, Juan Manuel Rosas and in Mexico Antonio López de Santa Anna are exemplars of caudillos. Although most countries created written constitutions and created separate branches of government, the state and the rule of law were weak, and the military emerged as the dominant institution in the civil sphere. Constitutions were written laying out division of powers, but the rule of personalist strongmen dominated. Dictatorial powers were granted to some strongmen, nominally ruling as presidents under a constitution, as "constitutional dictators." 
 
In the religious sphere, the Roman Catholic Church, one of the pillars of colonial rule, remained a powerful institution and generally continued as the only permissible religion. With the Spanish monarch no longer the patron of the church, many national governments asserted their right to appoint clerics as a logical transfer of power to a sovereign state. The Catholic Church denied that this right had transferred to the new governments, and for a time the Vatican refused to appoint new bishops. In Brazil, because the ruler after independence was a member of the House of Braganza, and Portugal recognized political independence quite speedily, the Vatican appointed a papal nuncio to Brazil in 1830. This official had jurisdiction over not just Brazil, but also the new states in Spanish America. However, in Brazil, there were also conflicts between church and state. During the reign of Pedro II, Protestant missionaries were tolerated, and when the monarchy was overthrown in 1889, the Catholic Church was disestablished.

In the new nation-states, conservatives favored the old order of a powerful, centralized state and continuation of the Catholic Church as a key institution. In Mexico, following the abdication of Emperor Iturbide in 1823, Mexican political leaders wrote a constitution for its newly declared federated republic, the Constitution of 1824. Central America opted out of joining the new federated republic of Mexico, with no real conflict. Hero of the insurgency Guadalupe Victoria became the first president of Mexico in 1824. Conservatives pushed to take control of the government, favoring central rule of the nation, as opposed to liberals, who generally favored the power of states expressed in federalism. General Santa Anna was elected president in 1833 and was in and out of office until 1854. In South America, Gran Colombia came into being, spanning what are now the separate countries of Colombia, Venezuela, Ecuador, Panama, and Peru, with independence leader Simón Bolívar as head of state (1819–30). Gran Colombia dissolved in 1831 due to conflicts similar to those elsewhere in Spanish America between centralist conservatives and pro-federalist liberals. In Argentina, the conflict resulted in a prolonged civil war between unitarianas (i.e. centralists) and federalists, which were in some aspects respectively analogous to liberals and conservatives in other countries. Adding to this dispute was the almost inherited colonial-era conflict over its borders with Brazil. The Cisplatine War erupted in 1814 and ended in 1828, resulting in occupation and further secession of Provincia Oriental which in 1830 became the modern Republic of Uruguay with a central government in Montevideo. Between 1832 and 1852, Argentina existed as a confederation, without a head of state, although the federalist governor of Buenos Aires province, Juan Manuel de Rosas, was given the power to pay debt and manage international relations, and exerted a growing hegemony over the country. A national constitution was not enacted until 1853, and reformed in 1860, and the country reorganized as a federal republic led by a liberal-conservative elite. Centralist Uruguay enacted its constitution on its first day of existence in 1830, but wasn't immune to a similar polarization of the new state that involved blancos and colorados, where the agrarian conservative interests of blancos were pitted against the liberal commercial interests of colorados based in Montevideo, and which eventually resulted in the Guerra Grande civil war (1839–1851). Both the blancos and colorados evolved into political parties of the same names that still exist in Uruguay today and are considered among the first and most longstanding political parties in the world.

In Brazil, Emperor Dom Pedro I, worn down by years of administrative turmoil and political dissension with both the liberal and conservative sides of politics (including an attempt of republican secession), went to Portugal in 1831 to reclaim his daughter's crown, abdicating the Brazilian throne in favor of his five-year-old son and heir (who thus became the Empire's second monarch, with the title of Dom Pedro II). As a minor, the new Emperor could not exert his constitutional powers until he came of age, so a regency was set up by the National Assembly. In the absence of a charismatic figure who could represent a moderate face of power, during this period a series of localized rebellions took place, as the Cabanagem, the Malê Revolt, the Balaiada, the Sabinada, and the Ragamuffin War, which emerged from dissatisfaction of the provinces with the central power, coupled with old and latent social tensions peculiar to a vast, slave-holding and newly independent nation state. This period of internal political and social upheaval, which included the Praieira revolt, was overcome only at the end of the 1840s, years after the end of the regency, which occurred with the premature coronation of Pedro II in 1841. During the last phase of the monarchy, an internal political debate was centered on the issue of slavery. The Atlantic slave trade was abandoned in 1850, as a result of the British Aberdeen Act, but only in May 1888 after a long process of internal mobilization and debate for an ethical and legal dismantling of slavery in the country, was the institution formally abolished. On 15 November 1889, worn out by years of economic stagnation, attrition of the majority of Army officers, as well as with rural and financial elites (for different reasons), the monarchy was overthrown by a military coup.

Foreign powers, particularly the Great Britain and the U.S., were keenly interested in the possibilities resulting from political independence. They quickly recognized the governments of newly independent countries in Latin America and established commercial relationships with them. The former imperial limits on trade with foreign powers ended with independence and foreign investors sought newly opened opportunities. With the 1803 Louisiana Purchase from France, the U.S. now bordered New Spain. Both the U.S. and Spain sought clarity about their borders, signing the 1819 Adams-Onís Treaty ceding Florida to the U.S. and setting the northern border of Spain's claim in North America. When Mexico achieved independence in 1821 and briefly became a monarchy, the U.S. recognized the government under Agustín de Iturbide, sending diplomat Joel Poinsett as its representative 1822–23. Poinsett concluded an agreement with Mexico confirming the terms of the Adams-Onís Treaty. Previously Poinsett had traveled widely in Latin America and had concluded a trade agreement with independent Argentina. European and U.S. interests in the region fueled the demand for Latin American travelogues, an important source of information that described economic, political, and social conditions.

The U.S. saw itself as an important power in the Americas and had a foreign policy interest in the hemisphere to exclude former imperial powers from regaining their influence. The first major articulation of U.S. foreign policy toward Latin America as a region was the 1820 Monroe Doctrine. It warned foreign powers not to intervene in the Americas. The U.S. was relatively weak compared to the powerful British Empire, but it was a key policy that informed U.S. actions toward Latin America to the current day. The U.S. was concerned that foreign powers could support Spain in its attempts to reclaim its empire. The actions that the U.S. took against potential reclamation of foreign powers of their former colonies often included its own direct interventions in the region, justified by President Theodore Roosevelt in his 1904 Roosevelt Corollary to the Monroe Doctrine.

For Britain, their commercial interests were eager to seize the opportunity to trade with newly independent Latin America. Britain and Portugal had long been allies against the Spanish and French, so British recognition of Brazil's 1822 independence followed quickly after Portugal's. As with many other Latin American countries, Brazil exported raw materials and imported manufactured goods, which for both Britain and Brazil suited their economic strengths. For Britain, asserting economic dominance in Latin America (what is now called neocolonialism) meant that nation-states were sovereign countries, but were dependent on other powers economically. British dominance hindered the development of Latin American industries and strengthened their dependence on the world trade network. Britain now replaced Spain as the region's largest trading partner. Great Britain invested significant capital in Latin America to develop the area as a market for processed goods. 

From the early 1820s to 1850, the post-independence economies of Latin American countries were lagging and stagnant. Over the nineteenth century, enhanced trade between Britain and Latin America led to development such as infrastructure improvements, including roads and railroads, which grew the trade between the countries and outside nations such as Great Britain. By 1870, exports dramatically increased, attracting capital from abroad (including Europe and USA). Until 1914 and the outbreak of World War I, Britain was a major economic power in Latin America, especially in South America.

For the U.S., its initial sphere of influence was in Mexico, but the drive for territorial expansion, particularly for Southern slave-owners seeking new territory for their enterprises, saw immigration of white slave-owners with their slaves to Texas, which ultimately precipitated conflict between the Mexican government and the Anglo-American settlers. The Texas Revolution of 1836-37 defeated Mexican forces, and in 1845, U.S. annexation of the Texas territory that Mexico still claimed set the stage for the Mexican–American War (1846–48). The war resulted in the resounding defeat of Mexico. U.S. troops occupied Mexico City. The Treaty of Guadalupe Hidalgo added a huge swath of what had been north and northwest Mexico to the U.S., territory that Spain and then Mexico had claimed, but had not succeeded in occupying effectively. Southern slave owners were also interested in the possibility of the U.S. acquiring Cuba from Spain, with the aim of expanding both slavery and U.S. territory. The 1854 leak of the Ostend Manifesto, offering $130 million to Spain, caused a scandal among abolitionists in the U.S., who sought to end the expansion of slavery. It was repudiated by U.S. President Franklin Pierce. The American Civil War (1861–1965) decided the question of slavery. Another episode in US–Latin American relations involved the filibuster William Walker. In 1855, he traveled to Nicaragua hoping to overthrow the government and take territory for the United States. With Only 56 followers, he was able to take over the city of Granada, declaring himself commander of the army and installing Patricio Rivas as a puppet president. However, Rivas' presidency ended when he fled Nicaragua; Walker rigged the ensuing election to ensure that he became the next president. His presidency did not last long, however, as he was met with much opposition in Nicaragua and from neighboring countries. On 1 May 1857, Walker was forced by a coalition of Central American armies to surrender himself to a United States Navy officer who repatriated him and his followers. When Walker subsequently returned to Central America in 1860, he was apprehended by the Honduran authorities and executed.

Britain's nineteenth-century policy was to end slavery and the slave trade, including in Latin America. In Brazil, Britain made the end of the slave trade a condition for diplomatic recognition. The Brazilian economy was entirely dependent on slaves. Abolitionists in Brazil pressed for the end of slavery, which finally ended in 1888, followed the next year by the fall of the Brazilian monarchy.

The French also sought commercial ties to Latin America, to export luxury goods and establish financial ties, including extending foreign loans to governments, often in dire need of revenue. As Mexican conservatives and liberals fought the War of the Reform over La Reforma, Mexican conservatives, to bolster their side, sought a European monarch to put on the throne of Mexico. Napoleon III of France invaded Mexico in 1862 and facilitated the appointment of Maximilian von Hapsburg. Since the U.S. was embroiled in its own civil war, it could not hinder the French occupation, which it saw as a violation of the Monroe Doctrine, but the government of Abraham Lincoln continued to recognize the Republic of Mexico as the nation's government under President Benito Juárez. The French were expelled in 1867 and Emperor Maximilian executed by the victorious Republican forces, setting the stage for an era of stability and foreign economic investment a few years later when Porfirio Díaz liberal hero of the war against the French, became president of Mexico for 30 years.

Export boom and neocolonialism

Latin American nations after about 1870 were stable enough politically and produced commodities in demand in Western Europe and the United States so that export economies tied producing countries to consuming countries. Rather than formally ruling countries in the region, investors and their government backers exercised power and influence over local elites seeking to maintain or enhance their own positions. Companies in Great Britain forged ties especially in Brazil and Argentina, with Brazilian coffee and Argentine beef and wheat becoming staples on European dining tables. Britain constructed infrastructure to enable the efficient movement of goods and people, building port facilities to accommodate transatlantic shipping, railroads to transport goods from interior regions of production to ports, and electricity enabling telegraphs, later telephones, and street lighting in urban areas. As technology became more sophisticated, bulky agricultural products like wheat could be shipped on large ships at relatively low cost. As refrigerated ships were developed, chilled beef and tropical bananas could be shipped efficiently enough that they would not spoil. The U.S. in particular imported bananas from Central and South America. The U.S. United Fruit Company and Cuyamel Fruit Company, both ancestors of Chiquita, and the Standard Fruit Company (now Dole), acquired large tracts of land in Central America, including Guatemala, Honduras, and Costa Rica, as well as Ecuador. The companies gained leverage over governments and ruling elites in these countries by dominating their economies and paying kickbacks, and exploited local workers. Such countries came to be called banana republics.
 
Demand for commodities fueled armed conflicts for territory with economic potential. One such conflict was the Spanish–American War in 1898, where the U.S. intervened in the long-standing independence war in Cuba against the Spanish crown, which had held onto it after the almost complete loss of is overseas territories in the early nineteenth century. Cuba produced sugar and tobacco, both in high demand in the U.S. In the treaty with Spain ending the war, the U.S. gain Puerto Rico, Spain's other remaining Caribbean colony, as well as the Philippine Islands. There were also conflicts between Latin American nations in the late nineteenth century, as well as protracted civil wars in Mexico and Colombia. One notable international conflict was the War of the Pacific from 1879 to 1884, in which Chile seized territory and resources from Peru and Bolivia, gaining valuable nitrate deposits and leaving Bolivia landlocked with no access to the sea. Another notable conflict was the War of the Triple Alliance (1864–1870) in which Paraguay under Francisco Solano López provoked war against Brazil, which allied with Argentina and Uruguay. The war was a disaster for Paraguay, with huge loss of life and destruction of the modernized sector.

The export boom created a demand for labor, which many countries could not meet domestically. Countries such as Argentina, Brazil, and Peru, sought laborers from abroad, some of whom immigrated permanently, while other workers developed a pattern of cyclical work, returning to their home countries at intervals. Workers came from poorer regions of Europe, such as Italy, but also China and Japan, with single men and few women making up the initial immigrant populations.

World War I (1914–1918) 

In general, Latin America stayed out of direct conflict in World War I, but the Great Powers were aware of the region's importance for the short and long term. Germany attempted to draw Mexico into supporting its side against the British, the French, and especially the U.S., by trying to leverage anti-Americanism to its advantage. The Great Powers had been actively working to affect the course of the Mexican Revolution (1910–1920). Great Britain and the U.S. had huge investments in Mexico, with Germany close behind, so the outcome of the conflict would have consequences there. The U.S. directly intervened militarily, but not on a huge scale. A German diplomatic proposal, now known as the January 1917 Zimmermann Telegram, sought to entice Mexico to join an alliance with Germany in the event of the United States entering World War I against Germany by promising the return of territory Mexico had lost to the U.S. The proposal was intercepted and decoded by British intelligence. The revelation of the contents outraged the American public and swayed public opinion. The news helped to generate support for the United States declaration of war on Germany in April 1917 as well as to calm U.S.-Mexico relations. Mexico, far weaker militarily, economically, and politically than the U.S., ignored the German proposal; after the U.S. entered the war, it officially rejected it.

When the U.S. entered the conflict in 1917, it abandoned its hunt in Mexico for the revolutionary Pancho Villa who had attacked the U.S. in Columbus, New Mexico. The Mexican government was not pro-Villa, but was angered by U.S. violation of Mexico's sovereign territory with troops. The expeditionary force led by General John J. Pershing that had hopelessly chased him around northern Mexico was deployed to Europe. The U.S. then asked Latin American nations to join Britain, France, and the U.S. against Germany. They were not quick to join, as Germany was now a major financial lender to Latin America, and a number of nations were antipathetic to the traditional lenders in Britain and France. While Latin America did join the allies, it was not without cost. The U.S. sought hemispheric solidarity against Germany, and Brazil, Costa Rica, Cuba, Guatemala, Honduras, Nicaragua and Haiti declared war. Others took the lesser step of breaking diplomatic relations. Argentina, Chile, Mexico and Uruguay remained neutral.
 
More important was the impact of the war on transatlantic shipping, the economic lifeline for their export economies. Export economies from the mining sector and especially nitrates for gunpowder did boom, but agricultural exports of sugar and coffee languished when European economies turned to war production. Britain was on the winning side of the war, but in the aftermath its economic power was fairly reduced. After 1914, the U.S. replaced Britain as the major foreign power in Latin America. Latin American nations gained standing internationally in the aftermath of the war, participating in the Versailles Conference, signing the Treaty of Versailles and joining the League of Nations. Latin America also played an important role in the International Court of Justice.

Interwar and World War II, 1920s–1945

The Great Depression was a worldwide phenomenon and had an impact on Latin America. Exports largely fell and economies stagnated. For a number of Latin American countries, the Depression made them favor an internal economic development policy of import substitution industrialization.

World War I and the League of Nations did not settle conflicts between European nations, but in the wake of World War I, Latin American nations gained success in pressing discussions of hemispheric importance. The Inter-American System was institutionally established with the First International Conference of American States of 1889–1890, where 17 Latin American nations sent delegates to Washington D.C. and formed the Pan American Union. Subsequent Pan-American Conferences saw the initial dominance of the U.S. in the hemisphere give way as Latin American nations asserted their priorities. The Havana Conference of 1928 was the high water mark of U.S. dominance and assertion of its right to intervene in Latin America, but with the election of Franklin Delano Roosevelt to the U.S. presidency in 1932, U.S. policy changed toward Latin America. He abandoned the routine U.S. interventions in Latin America that it had claimed as its right and initiated the Good Neighbor Policy in March 1933. He sought hemispheric cooperation rather than U.S. coercion in the region. At the Montevideo Convention in December 1933, the U.S. Secretary of State voted in favor of the Convention on the Rights and Duties of States, declaring "no state has the right to intervene in the internal or external affairs of another." President Roosevelt himself attended the inaugural session of the hemispheric conference in Buenos Aires in 1936, where the U.S. reaffirmed the policy of non-intervention in Latin America and discussed the issue of neutrality for the hemisphere should war break out. With the Nazi invasion of Poland in September 1939 and the spread of war in Europe, foreign ministers of hemispheric nations met in Panama, at which the Declaration of Neutrality was signed, and the territorial waters bordering the hemisphere were expanded. The aim of these moves was to strengthen hemispheric solidarity and security. With the 7 December 1941 Japanese attack on the U.S. naval base at Pearl Harbor, hemispheric ministers met in January 1942 in Rio de Janeiro. Some nations had already declared war on the Axis powers, while others severed relations with the Axis. Chile did not do so until 1943, and Argentina, traditionally pro-German, not until 1945. The U.S. requested that Germans suspected of Nazi sympathies be deported from Latin America to the U.S.

Cold War era (1945–1992)
Many Latin American economies continued to grow in the post-World War II era, but not as quickly as they had hoped. When the transatlantic trade re-opened following the peace, Europe looked as if it would need Latin American food exports and raw materials. The policies of import substitution industrialization adopted in Latin America when exports slowed due to the Great Depression and subsequent isolation in World War II were now subject to international competition. Those who supported a return to the export of commodities for which Latin America had a competitive advantage disagreed with advocates of an expanded industrial sector. The rebuilding of Europe, including Germany, with the aid of the U.S. after World War II did not bring stronger demand for Latin American exports. In Latin America, much of the hard currency earned by their participation in the war went to nationalize foreign-owned industries and pay down their debt. A number of governments set tariff and exchange rate policies that undermined the export sector and aided the urban working classes. Growth slowed in the post-war period and by the mid-1950s, the optimism of the postwar period was replaced by pessimism.

Following World War II, the United States policy toward Latin America focused on what it perceived as the threat of communism and the Soviet Union to the interests of Western Europe and the United States. Although Latin American countries had been staunch allies in the war and reaped some benefits from it, in the post-war period the region did not prosper as it had expected. Latin America struggled in the post-war period without large-scale aid from the U.S., which devoted its resources to rebuilding Western Europe, including Germany. In Latin America there was increasing inequality, with political consequences in the individual countries. The U.S. returned to a policy of interventionism when it felt its political and economic interests were threatened. With the breakup of the Soviet bloc in the late 1980s and early 1990s, including the Soviet Union itself, Latin America sought to find new solutions to long-standing problems. With its Soviet alliance dissolved, Cuba entered a Special Period of severe economic disruption, high death rates, and food shortages.

Deeply alarming for the U.S. were two revolutions that threaten, fed its dominance in the region. The Guatemalan Revolution (1944–54) saw the replacement of a U.S.-backed regime of Jorge Ubico in 1945 followed by elections. Reformist Dr. Juan José Arévalo (1945–51) was elected and began instituting populist reforms. Reforms included land laws that threatened the interests of large foreign-owned enterprises, a social security law, workmen's compensation, laws allowing labor to organize and strike, and universal suffrage except for illiterate women. His government established diplomatic ties with the Soviet Union in April 1945, when the Soviet Union and the U.S. were allied against the Axis powers. Communists entered leadership positions in the labor movement. At the end of his term, his hand-picked successor, the populist and nationalist Jacobo Arbenz, was elected. Arbenz proposed placing capital in the hands of Guatemalans, building new infrastructure, and significant land reform via Decree 900. With what the U.S. considered the prospect of even more radical changes in Guatemala, it backed a coup against Arbenz in 1954, overthrowing him. Argentine Che Guevara was in Guatemala during the Arbenz presidency; the coup ousting Arbenz was instructive for him and for Latin American nations seeking significant structural change. In 1954 the U.S. Central Intelligence Agency aided successful military coup against Arbenz.

 
The 1959 Cuban Revolution led by Cuban lawyer Fidel Castro overthrew the regime of Fulgencio Batista, with 1 January 1959 marking as the revolution's victory. The revolution was a huge event not only in Cuban history, but also the history of Latin America and the world. Almost the immediately, the U.S. reacted with hostility against the new regime. As the revolutionaries began consolidating power, many middle- and upper-class Cubans left for the U.S., likely not expecting the Castro regime to last long. Cuba became a poorer and blacker country, and the Cuba Revolution sought to transform the social and economic inequalities and political instability of the previous regimes into a more socially and economically equal one. The government put emphasis on literacy as a key to Cuba's overall betterment, essentially wiping out illiteracy after an early major literacy campaign. Schools became a means to instill in Cuban students messages of nationalism, solidarity with the Third World, and Marxism. Cuba also made a commitment to universal health care, so the education of doctors and construction of hospitals were top priorities. Cuba also sought to diversify its economy, until then based mainly on sugar, but also tobacco.

The U.S. attempted to overthrow Castro, using the template of the successful 1954 coup in Guatemala. In the April 1961 Bay of Pigs invasion, Cuba entered into a formal alliance with the Soviet Union. In February 1962, the U.S placed an embargo on trade with Cuba, which remains in force as of 2021. In February 1962, the U.S. pressured members of the Organization of American States to expel Cuba, attempting to isolate it. In response to the Bay of Pigs, Cuba called for revolution in the Americas. The efforts ultimately failed, most notably with Che Guevara in Bolivia, where he was isolated, captured, and executed.

When the U.S. discovered that the Soviet Union had placed missiles in Cuba in 1962, they reacted swiftly with a showdown now called the Cuban Missile Crisis, which ended with an agreement between the U.S. and the Soviet Union, who did not consult Cuba about its terms. One term of the agreement was that the U.S. would cease efforts to invade Cuba, a guarantee of its sovereignty. However, the U.S. continued to attempt to remove Castro from power by assassination. The Soviet Union continued to materially support the Cuban regime, providing oil and other petrochemicals, technical support, and other aid, in exchange for Cuban sugar and tobacco.

From 1959 to 1992, Fidel Castro ruled as a caudillo, or strong man, dominating politics and the international stage. His commitment to social and economic equality brought about positive changes in Cuba, including the improvement of the position of women, eliminating prostitution, reducing homelessness, and raising the standard of living for most Cubans. However, Cuba lacks freedom of expression; dissenters were monitored by the Committees for the Defense of the Revolution, and travel was restricted. In 1980, Castro told Cubans who wanted to leave to do so, promising that the government would not stop them. The Mariel boatlift saw some 125,000 Cubans sail from the Cuban port of Mariel, across the straits to the U.S., where U.S. President Carter initially welcomed them.

The Cuban Revolution had a tremendous impact not just on Cuba, but on Latin America as a whole, and the world. The Cuban Revolution was for many countries an inspiration and a model, but for the U.S. it was a challenge to its power and influence in Latin America. After leftists took power in Chile (1970) and Nicaragua (1979), Fidel Castro visited them both, extending Cuban solidarity. In Chile, Salvador Allende and a coalition of leftists, Unidad Popular, won an electoral victory in 1970 and lasted until the violent military coup of 11 September 1973. In the Nicaragua leftists held power from 1979 to 1990. The U.S. was concerned with the spread of communism in Latin America, and U.S. President Dwight Eisenhower responded to the threat he saw in the Dominican Republic's dictator Rafael Trujillo, who voiced a desire to seek an alliance with the Soviet Union. In 1961, Trujillo was murdered with weapons supplied by the CIA. U.S. President John F. Kennedy initiated the Alliance for Progress in 1961, to establish economic cooperation between the U.S. and Latin America and provide $20 billion for reform and counterinsurgency measures. The reform failed because of the simplistic theory that guided it and the lack of experienced American experts who understood Latin American customs.

From 1966 to the late 1980s, the Soviet government upgraded Cuba's military capabilities, and Cuba was active in foreign interventions, assisting with movements in several countries in Latin America and elsewhere in the world. Most notable were the MPLA during the Angolan Civil War and the Derg during the Ogaden War. They also supported governments and rebel movements in Syria, Mozambique, Algeria, Venezuela, Bolivia, and Vietnam.

In Chile, the postwar period saw uneven economic development. The mining sector (copper, nitrates) continued to be important, but an industrial sector also emerged. The agricultural sector stagnated and Chile needed to import foodstuffs. After the 1958 election, Chile entered a period of reform. The secret ballot was introduced, the Communist Party was relegalized, and populism grew in the countryside. In 1970, democratic elections brought to power socialist Salvador Allende, who implemented many reforms begun in 1964 under Christian Democrat Eduardo Frei. The economy continued to depend on mineral exports and a large portion of the population reaped no benefits from the prosperity and modernity of some sectors. Chile had a long tradition of stable electoral democracy, In the 1970 election, a coalition of leftists, the Unidad Popular ("popular unity") candidate Allende was elected. Allende and his coalition held power for three years, with the increasing hostility of the U.S. The Chilean military staged a bloody coup with US support in 1973. The military under General Augusto Pinochet then held power until 1990.

The 1970s and 1980s saw a large and complex political conflict in Central America. The U.S. administration of Ronald Reagan funded right-wing governments and proxy fighters against left-wing challenges to the political order. Complicating matters were the liberation theology emerging in the Catholic Church and the rapid growth of evangelical Christianity, which were entwined with politics. The Nicaraguan Revolution revealed the country as a major proxy war battleground in the Cold War. Although the initial overthrow of the Somoza regime in 1978–79 was a bloody affair, the Contra War of the 1980s took the lives of tens of thousands of Nicaraguans and was the subject of fierce international debate. During the 1980s both the FSLN (a leftist collection of political parties) and the Contras (a rightist collection of counter-revolutionary groups) received considerable aid from the Cold War superpowers. The Sandinistas allowed free elections in 1990 and after years of war, lost the election. They became the opposition party, following a peaceful transfer of power. A civil war in El Salvador pitted leftist guerrillas against a repressive government. The bloody war there ended in a stalemate, and following the fall of the Soviet Union, a negotiated peace accord ended the conflict in 1992. In Guatemala, the civil war included genocide of Mayan peasants. A peace accord was reached in 1996 and the Catholic Church called for a truth and reconciliation commission.

In the religious sphere, the Roman Catholic Church continued to be a major institution in nineteenth-century Latin America. For a number of countries in the nineteenth century, especially Mexico, liberals viewed the Catholic Church as an intransigent obstacle to modernization, and when liberals gained power, anticlericalism was written into law, such as the Mexican liberal Constitution of 1857 and the Uruguayan Constitution of 1913 which secularized the state. Although secularism was an increasing trend in Europe and North America, most Latin Americans identified as Catholic, even if they did not attend church regularly. Many followed folk Catholicism, venerated saints, and celebrated religious festivals. Many communities did not have a resident priest or even visits by priests to keep contact between the institutional church and the people. In the 1950s, evangelical Protestants began proselytizing in Latin America. In Brazil, the Catholic bishops organized themselves into a national council, aimed at better meeting the competition not only of Protestants, but also of secular socialism and communism. Following Vatican II (1962–65) called by Pope John XXIII, the Catholic Church initiated a series of major reforms empowering the laity. Colombian Catholic priest Camilo Torres took up arms with the Colombian guerrilla movement ELN, which modeled itself on Cuba but was killed in his first combat in 1966. In 1968, Pope Paul came to the meeting of Latin American bishops in Medellín, Colombia. Peruvian priest Gustavo Gutiérrez was one of the founders of liberation theology, a term he coined in 1968, sometimes described as linking Christianity and Marxism. Conservatives saw the church as politicized, and priests ask proselytizing leftist positions. Priests became targets as "subversives," such as Salvadoran Jesuit Rutilio Grande. Archbishop of El Salvador Óscar Romero called for an end to persecution of the church, and took positions of social justice. He was assassinated on 24 March 1980 while saying mass. Liberation theology informed the struggle by Nicaraguan leftists against the Somoza dictatorship, and when they came to power in 1979, the ruling group included some priests.

When a Polish cleric became Pope John Paul II following the death of Paul VI, and the brief papacy of John Paul I, he reversed the progressive position of the church, evident in the 1979 Puebla conference of Latin American bishops. On a papal visit to Nicaragua in 1983, he reprimanded Father Ernesto Cardenal, who was Minister of Culture, and called on priests to leave politics. Brazilian theologian Leonardo Boff was silenced by the Vatican. Despite the Vatican stance against liberation theology, articulated in 1984 by Cardinal Josef Ratzinger, later Pope Benedict XVI, many Catholic clergy and laity worked against repressive military regimes. After a military coup ousted the democratically elected Salvador Allende, the Chilean Catholic Church was a force in opposition to the regime of Augusto Pinochet and for human rights. The Argentine Church did not follow the Chilean pattern of opposition however. When Jesuit Jorge Bergoglio was elected Pope Francis, his actions during the Dirty War were an issue, as portrayed in the film The Two Popes.

Although most countries did not have Catholicism as the established religion, Protestantism made few inroads in the region until the late twentieth century. Evangelical Protestants, particularly Pentecostals, proselytized and gained adherents in Brazil, Central America, and elsewhere. In Brazil, Pentecostals had a long history. But in a number of countries ruled by military dictatorships many Catholics followed the social and political teachings of liberation theology and were seen as subversives. Under these conditions, the influence of religious non-Catholics grew. Evangelical churches often grew quickly in poor communities where small churches and members could participate in ecstatic worship, often many times a week. Pastors in these churches did attend a seminary nor were there other institutional requirements. In some cases, the first evangelical pastors came from the U.S., but these churches quickly became "Latin Americanized," with local pastors building religious communities. In some countries, they gained a significant hold and were not persecuted by military dictators, since they were largely apolitical. In Guatemala under General Efraín Ríos Montt, an evangelical Christian, Catholic Maya peasants were targeted as subversives and slaughtered. Perpetrators were later put on trial in Guatemala, including Ríos Montt.

Post-Cold War era

After the fall of the Soviet Union, the Cold War which saw U.S. intervention in Latin America as preventing Soviet influence dissipating. The Central American wars ended, with a free and fair election in Nicaragua that voted out the leftist Sandinistas, a peace treaty was concluded between factions in El Salvador, and the Guatemalan civil war ended. Cuba had lost its political and economic patron, the Soviet Union, which could no longer provide support. Cuba entered what is known there are the Special Period, when the economy contracted severely, but the revolutionary government nonetheless retained power and the U.S. remained hostile to its revolution. U.S. policy-makers developed the Washington Consensus, a set of specific economic policy prescriptions considered the standard reform package for crisis-wracked developing countries by Washington, D.C.-based institutions such as the International Monetary Fund (IMF), the World Bank, and the US Department of the Treasury during the 1980s and 1990s. The term has become associated with neoliberal policies in general and drawn into the broader debate over the expanding role of the free market, constraints upon the state, and US influence on other countries' national sovereignty.  The politico-economical initiative was institutionalized in North America by the 1994 NAFTA, and elsewhere in the Americas through a series of similar agreements. The comprehensive Free Trade Area of the Americas project, however, was rejected by most South American countries at the 4th Summit of the Americas in 2005.

A debt crisis ensured after 1982 when the price of oil crashed and Mexico announced that it could not meet its foreign debt payment obligations. Other Latin American economies followed suit, with hyperinflation and the inability of governments to meet their debt obligations and the era became known as the "lost decade." The debt crisis would lead to neoliberal reforms that would instigate many social movements in the region. A "reversal of development" reigned over Latin America, seen through negative economic growth, declines in industrial production, and thus, falling living standards for the middle and lower classes. Governments made financial security their primary policy goal over social programs, enacting new neoliberal economic policies that implemented privatization of previously national industries and the informal sector of labor. In an effort to bring more investors to these industries, these governments also embraced globalization through more open interactions with the international economy.

Significantly, democratic governments began replacing military regimes across much of Latin America and the realm of the state became more inclusive (a trend that proved conducive to social movements), but economic ventures remained exclusive to a few elite groups within society. Neoliberal restructuring consistently redistributed income upward, while denying political responsibility to provide social welfare rights, and development projects throughout the region increased both inequality and poverty. Feeling excluded from the new projects, the lower classes took ownership of their own democracy through a revitalization of social movements in Latin America.

Both urban and rural populations had serious grievances as a result of economic and global trends and voiced them in mass demonstrations. Some of the largest and most violent have been protests against cuts in urban services to the poor, such as the Caracazo in Venezuela and the Argentinazo in Argentina. In 2000, the Cochabamba Water War in Bolivia saw major protests against a World Bank-funded project that would have brought potable water to the city, but at a price that no residents could afford. The title of the Oscar nominated film Even the Rain alludes to the fact that Cochabamba residents could no longer legally collect rainwater; the film depicts the protest movement.

Rural movements made demands related to unequal land distribution, displacement at the hands of development projects and dams, environmental and Indigenous concerns, neoliberal agricultural restructuring, and insufficient means of livelihood. In Bolivia, coca workers organized into a union, and Evo Morales, ethnically an Aymara, became its head. The cocaleros supported the struggles in the Cochabamba water war. The rural-urban coalition became a political party, Movement for Socialism (Bolivia) (MAS, "more"), which decisively won the 2005 presidential election, making Evo Morales the first Indigenous president of Bolivia. A documentary of the campaign, Cocalero, shows how they successfully organized.

A number of movements have benefited considerably from transnational support from conservationists and INGOs. The Movement of Rural Landless Workers (MST) in Brazil for example is an important contemporary Latin American social movement.

Indigenous movements account for a large portion of rural social movements, including, in Mexico, the Zapatista rebellion and the broad Indigenous movement in Guerrero, Also important are the Confederation of Indigenous Nationalities of Ecuador (CONAIE) and Indigenous organizations in the Amazon region of Ecuador and Bolivia, pan-Mayan communities in Guatemala, and mobilization by the Indigenous groups of Yanomami peoples in the Amazon, Kuna peoples in Panama, and Altiplano Aymara and Quechua peoples in Bolivia.

After 2000

In many countries in the early 2000s, left-wing political parties rose to power, known as the Pink tide. The presidencies of Hugo Chávez (1999–2013) in Venezuela, Ricardo Lagos and Michelle Bachelet in Chile, Lula da Silva and Dilma Rousseff of the Workers Party (PT) in Brazil, Néstor Kirchner and his wife Cristina Fernández in Argentina, Tabaré Vázquez and José Mujica in Uruguay, Evo Morales in Bolivia, Daniel Ortega in Nicaragua, Rafael Correa in Ecuador, Fernando Lugo in Paraguay, Manuel Zelaya in Honduras (removed from power by a coup d'état), Mauricio Funes and Salvador Sánchez Cerén in El Salvador are all part of this wave of left-wing politicians who often declare themselves socialists, Latin Americanists, or anti-imperialists, often implying opposition to US policies towards the region. An aspect of this has been the creation of the eight-member ALBA alliance, or "The Bolivarian Alliance for the Peoples of Our America" (Spanish: Alianza Bolivariana para los Pueblos de Nuestra América) by some of these countries.

Following the pink tide, there was a Conservative wave across Latin America. In Mexico, the rightwing National Action Party (PAN) won the presidential election of 2000 with its candidate Vicente Fox, ending the 71-year rule of the Institutional Revolutionary Party.  He was succeed six-years later by another conservative, Felipe Calderón (2006-2012), who attempted to crack down on the Mexican drug cartels and instigated the Mexican drug war .  Several right-wing leaders rose to power, including Argentina's Mauricio Macri and Brazil's Michel Temer, following the impeachment of the country's first female president. In Chile, the conservative Sebastián Piñera succeeded the socialist Michelle Bachelet in 2017. In 2019, center-right Luis Lacalle Pou ended a 15-year leftist rule in Uruguay, after defeating the Broad Front candidate.

Economically, the 2000s commodities boom caused positive effects for many Latin American economies. Another trend was the rapidly increasing importance of their relations with China.
However, with the Great Recession beginning in 2008, there was an end to the commodity boom, resulting in economic stagnation or recession resulted in some countries. A number of left-wing governments of the Pink tide lost support. The worst-hit was Venezuela, which is facing severe social and economic upheaval.

Charges of against a major Brazilian conglomerate, Odebrecht, has raised allegations of corruption across the region's governments (see Operation Car Wash). This bribery ring has become the largest corruption scandal in Latin American history. As of July 2017, the highest ranking politicians charged were former Brazilian President Luiz Inácio Lula da Silva, who was arrested, and former Peruvian presidents Ollanta Humala, also arrested, and Alejandro Toledo, who fled to the United States and is now a fugitive.

The COVID-19 pandemic proved a political challenge for many unstable Latin American democracies, with scholars identifying a decline in civil liberties as a result of opportunistic emergency powers. This was especially true for countries with strong presidential regimes, such as Brazil.

Inequality

Wealth inequality in Latin America and the Caribbean remains a serious issue despite strong economic growth and improved social indicators. A report released in 2013 by the UN Department of Economic and Social Affairs entitled Inequality Matters: Report of the World Social Situation, observed that: 'Declines in the wage share have been attributed to the impact of labour-saving technological change and to a general weakening of labour market regulations and institutions.' Such declines are likely to disproportionately affect individuals in the middle and bottom of the income distribution, as they rely mostly on wages for income. In addition, the report noted that 'highly-unequal land distribution has created social and political tensions and is a source of economic inefficiency, as small landholders frequently lack access to credit and other resources to increase productivity, while big owners may not have had enough incentive to do so.

According to the United Nations ECLAC, Latin America is the most unequal region in the world. Inequality in Latin America has deep historical roots in the Latin European racially based Casta system instituted in Latin America during colonial times that has been difficult to eradicate because of the differences between initial endowments and opportunities among social groups have constrained the poorest's social mobility, thus causing poverty to transmit from generation to generation, and become a vicious cycle. Inequality has been reproduced and transmitted through generations because Latin American political systems allow a differentiated access on the influence that social groups have in the decision-making process, and it responds in different ways to the least favored groups that have less political representation and capacity of pressure. Recent economic liberalisation also plays a role as not everyone is equally capable of taking advantage of its benefits. Differences in opportunities and endowments tend to be based on race, ethnicity, rurality, and gender. Because inequality in gender and location are near-universal, race and ethnicity play a larger, more integral role in discriminatory practices in Latin America. The differences have a strong impact on the distribution of income, capital and political standing.

One indicator of inequality is access to and quality of education. During the first phase of globalization in Latin America, educational inequality was on the rise, peaking around the end of the 19th century. In comparison with other developing regions, Latin America then had the highest level of educational inequality, which is certainly a contributing factor for its current general high inequality. During the 20th century, however, educational inequality started decreasing.

Standard of living 
Latin America has the highest levels of income inequality in the world. The following table lists all the countries in Latin America indicating a valuation of the country's Human Development Index, GDP at purchasing power parity per capita, measurement of inequality through the Gini index, measurement of poverty through the Human Poverty Index, a measure of extreme poverty based on people living on less than 1.25 dollars a day, life expectancy, murder rates and a measurement of safety through the Global Peace Index. Green cells indicate the best performance in each category, and red the lowest.

Demographics

Largest cities
Urbanization accelerated starting in the mid-twentieth century, especially in capital cities, or in the case of Brazil, traditional economic and political hubs founded in the colonial era. In Mexico, the rapid growth and modernization in country's north has seen the growth of Monterrey, in Nuevo León. The following is a list of the ten largest metropolitan areas in Latin America. Entries in "bold" indicate they are ranked the highest.

Race and ethnicity

Latin American populations are diverse, with descendants of the Indigenous peoples, European whites, Africans initially brought as slaves, and Asians, as well as new immigrants. Mixing of groups was a fact of life at contact of the Old World and the New, but colonial regimes established legal and social discrimination against non-white populations simply on the basis of perceived ethnicity and skin color. Social class was usually linked to a person's racial category, with whites on top. During the colonial era, with a dearth initially of European women, European men and Indigenous women and African women produced what were considered mixed-race children. In Spanish America, the so-called Sociedad de castas or Sistema de castas was constructed by white elites to try to rationalize the processes at work. In the sixteenth century the Spanish crown sought to protect Indigenous populations from exploitation by white elites for their labor and land. The crown created the to paternalistically govern and protect Indigenous peoples. It also created the República de Españoles, which included not only European whites, but all non-Indigenous peoples, such as blacks, mulattoes, and mixed-race castas who were not dwelling in Indigenous communities. In the religious sphere, the Indigenous were deemed perpetual neophytes in the Catholic faith, which meant Indigenous men were not eligible to be ordained as Catholic priests; however, Indigenous were also excluded from the jurisdiction of the Inquisition. Catholics saw military conquest and religious conquest as two parts of the assimilation of Indigenous populations, suppressing Indigenous religious practices and eliminating the Indigenous priesthood. Some worship continued underground. Jews and other non-Catholics, such as Protestants (all called "Lutherans") were banned from settling and were subject to the Inquisition. Considerable mixing of populations occurred in cities, while the countryside was largely Indigenous. At independence in the early nineteenth century, in many places in Spanish America formal racial and legal distinctions disappeared, although black slavery was not uniformly abolished.

Significant black populations exist in Brazil and Spanish Caribbean islands such as Cuba and Puerto Rico and the circum-Caribbean mainland (Venezuela, Colombia, Panama), as long as in the southern part of South America and Central America (Honduras, Costa Rica, Nicaragua Ecuador, and Peru) a legacy of their use in plantations. All these areas had small white populations. In Brazil, coastal Indigenous peoples largely died out in the early sixteenth century, with Indigenous populations surviving far from cities, sugar plantations, and other European enterprises.

Dominican Republic, Puerto Rico, Cuba, and Brazil have dominate Mulatto/Triracial populations ("Pardo" in Brazil), in Brazil and Cuba, there is equally large white populations and smaller black populations, while Dominican Republic and Puerto Rico are more Mulatto/Triracial dominated, with significant black and white minorities. Parts of Central America and northern South America are more diverse in that they are dominated by Mestizos and whites but also have large numbers of Mulattos, blacks, and indigenous, especially Colombia, Venezuela, and Panama. The southern cone region, Argentina, Uruguay, and Chile are completely dominated by whites and mestizos. Haiti and other areas in the French Caribbean are dominated mostly by blacks. The rest of Latin America, including México, northern Central America (Guatemala, El Salvador, Honduras), and central South America (Peru, Ecuador, Bolivia, Paraguay), are dominated by mestizos but also have large white and indigenous minorities.

In the nineteenth century, a number of Latin American countries sought immigrants from Europe and Asia. With the abolition of black slavery in 1888, the Brazilian monarchy fell in 1889. By then, another source of cheap labor to work on coffee plantations was found in Japan. Chinese male immigrants arrived in Cuba, Mexico, Peru and elsewhere. With political turmoil in Europe during the mid-nineteenth century and widespread poverty, Germans, Spaniards, and Italians immigrated to Latin America in large numbers, welcomed by Latin American governments both as a source of labor as well as a way to increase the size of their white populations. In Argentina, many Afro-Argentines married Europeans, so that in modern Argentina there is no discernible black population.

In twentieth-century Brazil, sociologist Gilberto Freyre proposed that Brazil was a "racial democracy," with less discrimination against blacks than in the U.S. Subsequent research has shown that Brazilians also discriminate against darker citizens, and that whites remain the elites in the country. In Mexico, the Afro-Mexican population was largely written out of the national narrative of indigenismo, and Indigenous and especially mestizo populations were considered the true embodiment of Mexicanness (mexicanidad), "the cosmic race", according to Mexican intellectual José Vasconcelos. In Mexico, there was considerable discrimination against Asians, with calls for the expulsion of Chinese in northern Mexico during the Mexican Revolution (1910-1920) and racially motivated massacres.
In a number of Latin American countries, Indigenous groups have organized explicitly as Indigenous, to claim human rights and influence political power. With the passage of anti-colonial resolutions in the United Nations General Assembly and the signing of resolutions for Indigenous rights, the Indigenous are able to act to guarantee their existence within nation-states with legal standing.

Language

Spanish is the predominant language of Latin America. It is spoken as first language by about 60% of the population. Portuguese is spoken by about 30%, and about 10% speak other languages such as Quechua, Mayan languages, Guaraní, Aymara, Nahuatl, English, French, Dutch and Italian. Portuguese is spoken mostly in Brazil, the largest and most populous country in the region. Spanish is the official language of most of the other countries and territories on the Latin American mainland, as well as in Cuba and Puerto Rico (where it is co-official with English), and the Dominican Republic. French is spoken in Haiti and in the French overseas departments of Guadeloupe, Martinique, and Guiana. It is also spoken by some Panamanians of Afro-Antillean descent. Dutch is the official language in Suriname, Aruba, Curaçao, and the Netherlands Antilles. (As Dutch is a Germanic language, the territories are not necessarily considered part of Latin America.) However, the native language of Aruba, Bonaire, and Curaçao, is Papiamento, a creole language largely based on Portuguese and Spanish that has had a considerable influence from Dutch and the Portuguese-based creole languages.

Amerindian languages are widely spoken in Peru, Guatemala, Bolivia, Paraguay and Mexico, and to a lesser degree, in Panama, Ecuador, Brazil, Colombia, Venezuela, Argentina, and Chile. In other Latin American countries, the population of speakers of Indigenous languages tend to be very small or even non-existent, for example in Uruguay. Mexico is possibly contains more Indigenous languages than any other Latin American country, but the most-spoken Indigenous language there is Nahuatl.

In Peru, Quechua is an official language, alongside Spanish and other Indigenous languages in the areas where they predominate. In Ecuador, while Quichua holds no official status, it is a recognized language under the country's constitution; however, it is only spoken by a few groups in the country's highlands. In Bolivia, Aymara, Quechua and Guaraní hold official status alongside Spanish. Guaraní, like Spanish, is an official language of Paraguay, and is spoken by a majority of the population, which is, for the most part, bilingual, and it is co-official with Spanish in the Argentine province of Corrientes. In Nicaragua, Spanish is the official language, but on the country's Caribbean coast English and Indigenous languages such as Miskito, Sumo, and Rama also hold official status. Colombia recognizes all Indigenous languages spoken within its territory as official, though fewer than 1% of its population are native speakers of these languages. Nahuatl is one of the 62 Native languages spoken by Indigenous people in Mexico, which are officially recognized by the government as "national languages" along with Spanish.

Other European languages spoken in Latin America include: English, by half of the current population in Puerto Rico, as well as in nearby countries that may or may not be considered Latin American, like Belize and Guyana, and spoken by descendants of British settlers in Argentina and Chile. German is spoken in southern Brazil, southern Chile, portions of Argentina, Venezuela and Paraguay; Italian in Brazil, Argentina, Venezuela, and Uruguay; Ukrainian, Polish, and Russian in southern Brazil and Argentina; and Welsh, in southern Argentina. Yiddish and Hebrew are possible to be heard around Buenos Aires and São Paulo especially. Non-European or Asian languages include Japanese in Brazil, Peru, Bolivia, and Paraguay, Korean in Brazil, Argentina, Paraguay, and Chile, Arabic in Argentina, Brazil, Colombia, Venezuela, and Chile, and Chinese throughout South America. Countries like Venezuela, Argentina and Brazil have their own dialects or variations of German and Italian.

In several nations, especially in the Caribbean region, creole languages are spoken. The most widely-spoken creole language in Latin America and the Caribbean is Haitian Creole, the predominant language of Haiti, derived primarily from French and certain West African tongues, with Amerindian, English, Portuguese and Spanish influences as well. Creole languages of mainland Latin America, similarly, are derived from European languages and various African tongues.

The Garifuna language is spoken along the Caribbean coast in Honduras, Guatemala, Nicaragua and Belize, mostly by the Garifuna people, a mixed-race Zambo people who were the result of mixing between Indigenous Caribbeans and escaped Black slaves. Primarily an Arawakan language, it has influences from Caribbean and European languages.

Archaeologists have deciphered over 15 pre-Columbian distinct writing systems from Mesoamerican societies. Ancient Maya had the most sophisticated textually written language, but since texts were largely confined to the religious and administrative elite, traditions were passed down orally. Oral traditions also prevailed in other major Indigenous groups including, but not limited to the Aztecs and other Nahuatl speakers, Quechua and Aymara of the Andean regions, the Quiché of Central America, the Tupi-Guaraní in today's Brazil, the Guaraní in Paraguay and the Mapuche in Chile.

Religion

The vast majority of Latin Americans are Christians (90%), mostly Roman Catholics belonging to the Latin Church. About 70% of the Latin American population considers itself Catholic. In 2012 Latin America constitutes in absolute terms the second world's largest Christian population, after Europe.

According to the detailed Pew multi-country survey in 2014, 69% of the Latin American population is Catholic and 19% is Protestant. Protestants are 26% in Brazil and over 40% in much of Central America. More than half of these are converts from Roman Catholicism.

Migration

The entire hemisphere was settled by migrants from Asia, Europe, and Africa. Native American populations settled throughout the hemisphere before the arrival of Europeans in the late fifteenth and sixteenth centuries, and the forced migration of slaves from Africa.

In the post-independence period, a number of Latin American countries sought to attract European immigrants as a source of labor as well as to deliberately change the proportions of racial and ethnic groups within their borders. Chile, Argentina, and Brazil actively recruited labor from Catholic southern Europe, where populations were poor and sought better economic opportunities. Many nineteenth-century immigrants went to the United States and Canada, but a significant number arrived in Latin America. Although Mexico tried to attract immigrants, it largely failed. As black slavery was abolished in Brazil in 1888, coffee growers recruited Japanese migrants to work in coffee plantations. There is a significant population of Japanese descent in Brazil. Cuba and Peru recruited Chinese labor in the late nineteenth century. Some Chinese immigrants who were excluded from immigrating to the U.S. settled in northern Mexico. When the U.S. acquired its southwest by conquest in the Mexican American War, Latin American populations did not cross the border to the U.S., the border crossed them.

In the twentieth century there have been several types of migration. One is the movement of rural populations within a given country to cities in search of work, causing many Latin American cities to grow significantly. Another is international movement of populations, often fleeing repression or war. Other international migration is for economic reasons, often unregulated or undocumented. Mexicans immigrated to the U.S. during the violence of the Mexican Revolution (1910-1920) and the religious Cristero War (1926–29); during World War II, Mexican men worked in the U.S. in the bracero program. Economic migration from Mexico followed the crash of the Mexican economy in the 1980s.
Spanish refugees fled to Mexico following the fascist victory in the Spanish Civil War (1936–38), with some 50,000 exiles finding refuge at the invitation of President Lázaro Cárdenas. Following World War II a larger wave of refugees to Latin America, many of them Jews, settled in Argentina, Brazil, Chile, Cuba, and Venezuela. Some were only transiting through the region, but others stayed and created communities. A number of Nazis escaped to Latin America, living under assumed names, in an attempting to avoid attention and prosecution.

In the aftermath of the Cuban Revolution, middle class and elite Cubans moved to the U.S., particularly to Florida. Some fled Chile for the U.S. and Europe after the 1973 military coup. Colombians migrated to Spain and the United Kingdom during the region's political turmoil, compounded by the rise of narcotrafficking and guerrilla warfare. During the Central American wars of the 1970s to the 1990s, many Salvadorans, Guatemalans, and Hondurans migrated to the U.S. to escape narcotrafficking, gangs, and poverty. As living conditions deteriorated in Venezuela under Hugo Chávez and Nicolás Maduro, many left for neighboring Colombia and Ecuador. In the 1990s, economic stress in Ecuador during the La Década Perdida triggered considerable migration to Spain and to the U.S.

Some Latin American countries seek to strengthen links between migrants and their states of origin, while promoting their integration in the receiving state. These emigrant policies focus on the rights, obligations and opportunities for participation of emigrated citizens who already live outside the borders of the country of origin. Research on Latin America shows that the extension of policies towards migrants is linked to a focus on civil rights and state benefits that can positively influence integration in recipient countries. In addition, the tolerance of dual citizenship has spread more in Latin America than in any other region of the world.

Education

Despite significant progress, education access and school completion remains unequal in Latin America. The region has made great progress in educational coverage; almost all children attend primary school, and access to secondary education has increased considerably. Quality issues such as poor teaching methods, lack of appropriate equipment, and overcrowding exist throughout the region. These issues lead to adolescents dropping out of the educational system early. Most educational systems in the region have implemented various types of administrative and institutional reforms that have enabled reach for places and communities that had no access to education services in the early 1990s. School meal programs are also employed to expand access to education, and at least 23 countries in the Latin America and Caribbean region have large-scale school feeding activities, altogether reaching 88% of primary school-age children in the region. Compared to prior generations, Latin American youth have seen an increase in their levels of education. On average, they have completed two more years of school than their parents.

However, there are still 23 million children in the region between the ages of 4 and 17 outside of the formal education system. Estimates indicate that 30% of preschool age children (ages 4–5) do not attend school, and for the most vulnerable populations, the poor and rural, this proportion exceeds 40 percent. Among primary school age children (ages 6 to 12), attendance is almost universal; however there is still a need to enroll five million more children in the primary education system. These children mostly live in remote areas, are Indigenous or Afro-descendants and live in extreme poverty.

Among people between the ages of 13 and 17 years, only 80% are full-time students, and only 66% of these advance to secondary school. These percentages are lower among vulnerable population groups: only 75% of the poorest youth between the ages of 13 and 17 years attend school. Tertiary education has the lowest coverage, with only 70% of people between the ages of 18 and 25 years outside of the education system. Currently, more than half of low income or rural children fail to complete nine years of education.

Crime and violence

Latin America and the Caribbean have been cited by numerous sources to be the most dangerous regions in the world. Studies have shown that Latin America contains the majority of the world's most dangerous cities. Many analysts attribute this to social and income inequality in the region. Many agree that the prison crisis will not be resolved until the gap between the rich and the poor is addressed.

Crime and violence prevention and public security are now important issues for governments and citizens in Latin America and the Caribbean region. Homicide rates in Latin America are the highest in the world. From the early 1980s through the mid-1990s, homicide rates increased by 50 percent. Latin America and the Caribbean experienced more than 2.5 million murders between 2000 and 2017. There were a total of 63,880 murders in Brazil in 2018.

The most frequent victims of such homicides are young men, 69 percent of them between the ages of 15 and 19. Countries with the highest homicide rate per year per 100,000 inhabitants in 2015 were: El Salvador 109, Honduras 64, Venezuela 57, Jamaica 43, Belize 34.4, St. Kitts and Nevis 34, Guatemala 34, Trinidad and Tobago 31, the Bahamas 30, Brazil 26.7, Colombia 26.5, the Dominican Republic 22, St. Lucia 22, Guyana 19, Mexico 16, Puerto Rico 16, Ecuador 13, Grenada 13, Costa Rica 12, Bolivia 12, Nicaragua 12, Panama 11, Antigua and Barbuda 11, and Haiti 10. Most of the countries with the highest homicide rates are in Africa and Latin America. Countries in Central America, like El Salvador and Honduras, top the list of homicides in the world.

Brazil has more overall homicides than any country in the world, at 50,108, accounting for one in 10 globally. Crime-related violence is the biggest threat to public health in Latin America, striking more victims than HIV/AIDS or any other infectious disease. Countries with the lowest homicide rate per year per 100,000 inhabitants as of 2015 were: Chile 3, Peru 7, Argentina 7, Uruguay 8 and Paraguay 9.

Public health

Water

Reproductive rights

HIV/AIDS

Economy

Size

According to Goldman Sachs' BRICS review of emerging economies, by 2050 the largest economies in the world will be as follows: China, United States, India, Japan, Germany, United Kingdom, Mexico and Brazil.

Agriculture

The four countries with the strongest agricultural sector in South America are Brazil, Argentina, Chile and Colombia. Currently:

 Brazil is the world's largest producer of sugarcane, soy, coffee, oranges, guaraná, açaí and Brazil nut; is one of the top five producers of maize, papaya, tobacco, pineapple, banana, cotton, beans, coconut, watermelon, lemon and yerba mate; is one of the top ten world producers of cocoa, cashew, avocado, tangerine, persimmon, mango, guava, rice, oat, sorghum and tomato; and is one of the top 15 world producers of grapes, apples, melons, peanuts, figs, peaches, onions, palm oil and natural rubber;
 Argentina is the world's largest producer of yerba mate; is one of the five largest producers in the world of soy, maize, sunflower seeds, lemons and pears, one of the 10 largest producers in the world of barley, grapes, artichokes, tobacco and cotton, and one of the 15 largest producers in the world of wheat, oats, chickpeas, sugarcane, sorghum and grapefruit;
 Chile is one of the five largest world producers of cherries and cranberries, and one of the ten largest world producers of grapes, apples, kiwi, peaches, plums and hazelnuts, focusing on exporting high-value fruits;
 Colombia is one of the five largest producers in the world of coffee, avocados and palm oil, and one of the ten largest producers in the world of sugarcane, bananas, pineapples and cocoa;
 Peru is the world's largest producer of quinoa; is one of the five largest producers of avocados, blueberry, artichokes and asparagus; one of the ten largest producers in the world of coffee and cocoa; one of the 15 largest producers in the world of potatoes and pineapples, and also has a large production of grapes, sugarcane, rice, bananas, maize and cassava; its agriculture is considerably diversified;
 Paraguay is currently the 6th largest producer of soy in the world and entering the list of the 20 largest producers of maize and sugarcane.

In Central America, the following stand out:
 Guatemala is one of the ten largest producers in the world of coffee, sugar cane, melons and natural rubber, and one of the world's 15 largest producers of bananas and palm oil;
 Honduras is one of the five largest producers of coffee in the world, and one of the ten largest producers of palm oil;
 Costa Rica is the world's largest producer of pineapples;
 Dominican Republic is one of the world's top five producers of papayas and avocados, and one of the ten largest producers of cocoa.
 Mexico is the world's largest producer of avocados, one of the world's top five producers of Chile, lemons, oranges, mangos, papayas, strawberries, grapefruit, pumpkins and asparagus, and one of the world's 10 largest producers of sugar cane, maize, sorghum, beans, tomatoes, coconuts, pineapple, melons and blueberries.

Brazil is the world's largest exporter of chicken meat: 3.77 million tons in 2019. The country had the second largest herd of cattle in the world, 22.2% of the world herd. The country was the second largest producer of beef in 2019, responsible for 15.4% of global production. It was also the third largest world producer of milk in 2018. This year, the country produced 35.1 billion liters. In 2019, Brazil was the fourth largest pork producer in the world, with almost four million tons.

In 2018, Argentina was the fourth largest producer of beef in the world, with a production of 3 million tons (behind only USA, Brazil and China). Uruguay is also a major meat producer. In 2018, it produced 589 thousand tons of beef.

In the production of chicken meat, Mexico is among the ten largest producers in the world, Argentina among the 15 largest and Peru and Colombia among the 20 largest. In beef production, Mexico is one of the ten largest producers in the world and Colombia is one of the 20 largest producers. In the production of pork, Mexico is among the 15 largest producers in the world. In the production of honey, Argentina is among the five largest producers in the world, Mexico among the ten largest and Brazil among the 15 largest. In terms of cow's milk production, Mexico is among the 15 largest producers in the world and Argentina among the 20 largest.

Mining and petroleum

Mining is one of the most important economic sectors in Latin America, especially for Chile, Peru and Bolivia, whose economies are highly dependent on this sector. The continent has large productions of:
gold (mainly in Peru, Mexico, Brazil and Argentina); 
silver (mainly in Mexico, Peru, Chile, Bolivia and Argentina); 
copper (mainly in Chile, Peru, Mexico and Brazil); 
iron ore (Brazil, Peru and Chile); 
zinc (Peru, Mexico, Bolivia and Brazil); 
molybdenum (Chile, Peru and Mexico); 
lithium (Chile, Argentina and Brazil); 
lead (Peru, Mexico and Bolivia); 
bauxite (Brazil and Jamaica); 
tin (Peru, Bolivia and Brazil); 
manganese (Brazil and Mexico); 
antimony (Bolivia, Mexico, Guatemala and Ecuador); 
nickel (Brazil, Dominican Republic and Cuba); 
niobium (Brazil); 
rhenium (Chile); 
iodine (Chile),

Brazil stands out in the extraction of 
iron ore (where it is the 2nd largest producer and exporter in the world—iron ore is usually one of the three export products that generate the greatest value in the country's trade balance)
copper
gold
bauxite (one of the five largest producers in the world)
manganese (one of the five largest producers in the world)
tin (one of the largest producers in the world)
niobium (98% of known world reserves) and 
nickel

In terms of gemstones, Brazil is the world's largest producer of amethysts, topaz, and agates and one of the main producers of tourmaline, emeralds, aquamarines, garnets and opals.

Chile contributes about a third of the world's copper production. In addition, Chile was, in 2019, the world's largest producer of iodine and rhenium, the second largest producer of lithium and molybdenum, the sixth largest producer of silver, the seventh largest producer of salt, the eighth largest producer of potash, the thirteenth-largest producer of sulfur and the thirteenth largest producer of iron ore in the world.

In 2019, Peru was the second largest world producer of copper and silver, 8th largest world producer of gold, third largest world producer of lead, second largest world producer of zinc, fourth largest world producer of tin, fifth largest world producer of boron, and fourth largest world producer of molybdenum.

In 2019, Bolivia was the eighth largest world producer of silver; fourth largest world producer of boron; fifth largest world producer of antimony; fifth largest world producer of tin; sixth largest world producer of tungsten; seventh largest producer of zinc, and the eighth largest producer of lead.

In 2019, Mexico was the world's largest producer of silver (representing almost 23% of world production, producing more than 200 million ounces in 2019); ninth largest producer of gold, the eighth largest producer of copper, the world's fifth largest producer of lead, the world's sixth largest producer of zinc, the world's fifth largest producer of molybdenum, the world's third largest producer of mercury, the world's fifth largest producer of bismuth, the world's 13th largest producer of manganese and the 23rd largest world producer of phosphate. It is also the eighth largest world producer of salt.

In 2019, Argentina was the fourth largest world producer of lithium, the ninth largest world producer of silver, the 17th largest world producer of gold and the seventh largest world producer of boron.

Colombia is the world's largest producer of emeralds. In the production of gold, between 2006 and 2017, the country produced 15 tons per year until 2007, when its production increased significantly, breaking a record of 66.1 tons extracted in 2012. In 2017, it extracted 52.2 tons. The country is among the 25 largest gold producers in the world. In the production of silver, in 2017 the country extracted 15,5 tons.

In the production of oil, Brazil was the tenth largest oil producer in the world in 2019, with 2.8 million barrels a day. Mexico was the twelfth largest, with 2.1 million barrels a day, Colombia in 20th place with 886 thousand barrels a day, Venezuela was the twenty-first place, with 877 thousand barrels a day, Ecuador in 28th with 531 thousand barrels a day and Argentina. 29th with 507 thousand barrels a day. Since Venezuela and Ecuador consume little oil and export most of their production, they are part of OPEC. Venezuela had a big drop in production after 2015 (when it produced 2.5 million barrels a day), falling in 2016 to 2.2 million, in 2017 to 2 million, in 2018 to 1.4 million and in 2019 to 877 thousand, due to lack of investment.

In the production of natural gas, in 2018, Argentina produced 1,524 bcf (billions of cubic feet), Mexico produced 999, Venezuela 946, Brazil 877, Bolivia 617, Peru 451, Colombia 379.

In the production of coal, the continent had three of the 30 largest world producers in 2018: Colombia (12th), Mexico (24th) and Brazil (27th).

Manufacturing

The World Bank annually lists the top manufacturing countries by total manufacturing value. According to the 2019 list:
Mexico had the twelfth most valuable industry in the world (US$217.8 billion)
Brazil the thirteenth largest (US$173.6 billion)
Venezuela the thirtieth largest (US$58.2 billion, however, it depends on oil to reach this value)
Argentina the 31st largest (US$57.7 billion)
Colombia the 46th largest (US$35.4 billion)
Peru the 50th largest (US$28.7 billion) 
Chile the 51st largest (US$28.3 billion).

In Latin America, few countries stand out in industrial activity: Brazil, Argentina, Mexico and, less prominently, Chile. Begun late, the industrialization of these countries received a great boost from World War II: this prevented the countries at war from buying the products they were used to importing and exporting what they produced. At that time, benefiting from the abundant local raw material, the low wages paid to the labor force and a certain specialization brought by immigrants, countries such as Brazil, Mexico and Argentina, as well as Venezuela, Chile, Colombia and Peru, were able to implement important industrial parks. In general, in these countries there are industries that require little capital and simple technology for their installation, such as the food processing and textile industries. The basic industries (steel, etc.) also stand out, as well as the metallurgical and mechanical industries.

The industrial parks of Brazil, Mexico, Argentina and Chile, however, present much greater diversity and sophistication, producing advanced technology items. In the rest of Latin American countries, mainly in Central America, the processing industries of primary products for export predominate.

In the food industry, in 2019, Brazil was the second largest exporter of processed foods in the world. In 2016, the country was the second largest producer of pulp in the world and the eighth largest producer of paper. In the footwear industry, in 2019, Brazil ranked fourth among world producers. In 2019, the country was the eighth largest producer of vehicles and the ninth largest producer of steel in the world. In 2018, the chemical industry of Brazil was the eighth largest in the world. In the textile industry, Brazil, although it was among the five largest world producers in 2013, is very little integrated into world trade. In the aviation sector, Brazil has Embraer, the third largest aircraft manufacturer in the world, behind Boeing and Airbus.

Infrastructure

Transport in Latin America is basically carried out using the road mode, the most developed in the region. There is also a considerable infrastructure of ports and airports. The railway and fluvial sector, although it has potential, is usually treated in a secondary way.

Brazil has more than 1.7 million km of roads, of which 215,000 km are paved, and about 14,000 km are divided highways. The two most important highways in the country are BR-101 and BR-116. Argentina has more than 600,000 km of roads, of which about 70,000 km are paved, and about 2,500 km are divided highways. The three most important highways in the country are Route 9, Route 7 and Route 14. Colombia has about 210,000 km of roads, and about 2,300 km are divided highways. Chile has about 82,000 km of roads, 20,000 km of which are paved, and about 2,000 km are divided highways. The most important highway in the country is the Route 5 (Pan-American Highway) These 4 countries are the ones with the best road infrastructure and with the largest number of double-lane highways, in South America.

Due to the Andes Mountains, Amazon River and Amazon Forest, there have always been difficulties in implementing transcontinental or bioceanic highways. Practically the only route that existed was the one that connected Brazil to Buenos Aires, in Argentina and later to Santiago, in Chile. However, in recent years, with the combined effort of countries, new routes have started to emerge, such as Brazil-Peru (Interoceanic Highway), and a new highway between Brazil, Paraguay, northern Argentina and northern Chile (Bioceanic Corridor).

There are more than 2,000 airports in Brazil. The country has the second largest number of airports in the world, behind only the United States. São Paulo International Airport, located in the Metropolitan Region of São Paulo, is the largest and busiest in the country – the airport connects São Paulo to practically all major cities around the world. Brazil has 44 international airports, such as those in Rio de Janeiro, Brasília, Belo Horizonte, Porto Alegre, Florianópolis, Cuiabá, Salvador, Recife, Fortaleza, Belém and Manaus, among others. Argentina has important international airports such as Buenos Aires, Cordoba, Bariloche, Mendoza, Salta, Puerto Iguazú, Neuquén and Usuhaia, among others. Chile has important international airports such as Santiago, Antofagasta, Puerto Montt, Punta Arenas and Iquique, among others. Colombia has important international airports such as Bogotá, Medellín, Cartagena, Cali and Barranquilla, among others. Peru has important international airports such as Lima, Cuzco and Arequipa. Other important airports are those in the capitals of Uruguay (Montevideo), Paraguay (Asunción), Bolivia (La Paz) and Ecuador (Quito). The 10 busiest airports in South America in 2017 were: São Paulo-Guarulhos (Brazil), Bogotá (Colombia), São Paulo-Congonhas (Brazil), Santiago (Chile), Lima (Peru), Brasília (Brazil), Rio de Janeiro (Brazil), Buenos Aires-Aeroparque (Argentina), Buenos Aires-Ezeiza (Argentina), and Minas Gerais (Brazil).

There are 1,834 airports in Mexico, the third-largest number of airports by country in the world. The seven largest airports—which absorb 90% of air travel—are (in order of air traffic): Mexico City, Cancún, Guadalajara, Monterrey, Tijuana, Acapulco, and Puerto Vallarta. Considering all of Latin America, the 10 busiest airports in 2017 were: Mexico City (Mexico), São Paulo-Guarulhos (Brazil), Bogotá (Colombia), Cancún (Mexico), São Paulo-Congonhas (Brazil), Santiago ( Chile), Lima (Peru), Brasilia (Brazil), Rio de Janeiro (Brazil) and Tocumen (Panama).

About ports, Brazil has some of the busiest ports in South America, such as Port of Santos, Port of Rio de Janeiro, Port of Paranaguá, Port of Itajaí, Port of Rio Grande, Port of São Francisco do Sul and Suape Port. Argentina has ports such as Port of Buenos Aires and Port of Rosario. Chile has important ports in Valparaíso, Caldera, Mejillones, Antofagasta, Iquique, Arica and Puerto Montt. Colombia has important ports such as Buenaventura, Cartagena Container Terminal and Puerto Bolivar. Peru has important ports in Callao, Ilo and Matarani. The 15 busiest ports in South America are: Port of Santos (Brazil), Port of Bahia de Cartagena (Colombia), Callao (Peru), Guayaquil (Ecuador), Buenos Aires (Argentina), San Antonio (Chile), Buenaventura (Colombia), Itajaí (Brazil), Valparaíso (Chile), Montevideo (Uruguay), Paranaguá (Brazil), Rio Grande (Brazil), São Francisco do Sul (Brazil), Manaus (Brazil) and Coronel (Chile).

The four major seaports concentrating around 60% of the merchandise traffic in Mexico are Altamira and Veracruz in the Gulf of Mexico, and Manzanillo and Lázaro Cárdenas in the Pacific Ocean. Considering all of Latin America, the 10 largest ports in terms of movement are: Colon (Panama), Santos (Brazil), Manzanillo (Mexico), Bahia de Cartagena (Colombia), Pacifico (Panama), Callao (Peru), Guayaquil ( Ecuador), Buenos Aires (Argentina), San Antonio (Chile) and Buenaventura (Colombia).

The Brazilian railway network has an extension of about 30,000 kilometers. It is basically used for transporting ores. The Argentine rail network, with 47,000 km of tracks, was one of the largest in the world and continues to be the most extensive in Latin America. It came to have about 100,000 km of rails, but the lifting of tracks and the emphasis placed on motor transport gradually reduced it. It has four different trails and international connections with Paraguay, Bolivia, Chile, Brazil and Uruguay. Chile has almost 7,000 km of railways, with connections to Argentina, Bolivia and Peru. Colombia has only about 3,500 km of railways.

Among the main Brazilian waterways, two stand out: Hidrovia Tietê-Paraná (which has a length of 2,400 km, 1,600 on the Paraná River and 800 km on the Tietê River, draining agricultural production from the states of Mato Grosso, Mato Grosso do Sul, Goiás and part of Rondônia, Tocantins and Minas General) and Hidrovia do Solimões-Amazonas (it has two sections: Solimões, which extends from Tabatinga to Manaus, with approximately 1600 km, and Amazonas, which extends from Manaus to Belém, with 1650 km. Almost entirely passenger transport from the Amazon plain is done by this waterway, in addition to practically all cargo transportation that is directed to the major regional centers of Belém and Manaus). In Brazil, this transport is still underutilized: the most important waterway stretches, from an economic point of view, are found in the Southeast and South of the country. Its full use still depends on the construction of locks, major dredging works and, mainly, of ports that allow intermodal integration. In Argentina, the waterway network is made up of the La Plata, Paraná, Paraguay and Uruguay rivers. The main river ports are Zárate and Campana. The port of Buenos Aires is historically the first in individual importance, but the area known as Up-River, which stretches along 67 km of the Santa Fé portion of the Paraná River, brings together 17 ports that concentrate 50% of the total exports of the country.

Energy

Brazil

The Brazilian government has undertaken an ambitious program to reduce dependence on imported petroleum. Imports previously accounted for more than 70% of the country's oil needs but Brazil became self-sufficient in oil in 2006–2007. Brazil was the 10th largest oil producer in the world in 2019, with 2.8 million barrels / day. Production manages to supply the country's demand. In the beginning of 2020, in the production of oil and natural gas, the country exceeded 4 million barrels of oil equivalent per day, for the first time. In January this year, 3.168 million barrels of oil per day and 138.753 million cubic meters of natural gas were extracted.

Brazil is one of the main world producers of hydroelectric power. In 2019, Brazil had 217 hydroelectric plants in operation, with an installed capacity of 98,581 MW, 60.16% of the country's energy generation. In the total generation of electricity, in 2019 Brazil reached 170,000 megawatts of installed capacity, more than 75% from renewable sources (the majority, hydroelectric).

In 2013, the Southeast Region used about 50% of the load of the National Integrated System (SIN), being the main energy consuming region in the country. The region's installed electricity generation capacity totaled almost 42,500 MW, which represented about a third of Brazil's generation capacity. The hydroelectric generation represented 58% of the region's installed capacity, with the remaining 42% corresponding basically to the thermoelectric generation. São Paulo accounted for 40% of this capacity; Minas Gerais by about 25%; Rio de Janeiro by 13.3%; and Espírito Santo accounted for the rest. The South Region owns the Itaipu Dam, which was the largest hydroelectric plant in the world for several years, until the inauguration of Three Gorges Dam in China. It remains the second largest operating hydroelectric in the world. Brazil is the co-owner of the Itaipu Plant with Paraguay: the dam is located on the Paraná River, located on the border between countries. It has an installed generation capacity of 14 GW for 20 generating units of 700 MW each. North Region has large hydroelectric plants, such as Belo Monte Dam and Tucuruí Dam, which produce much of the national energy. Brazil's hydroelectric potential has not yet been fully exploited, so the country still has the capacity to build several renewable energy plants in its territory.

 according to ONS, total installed capacity of wind power was 22 GW, with average capacity factor of 58%. While the world average wind production capacity factors is 24.7%, there are areas in Northern Brazil, specially in Bahia State, where some wind farms record with average capacity factors over 60%; the average capacity factor in the Northeast Region is 45% in the coast and 49% in the interior. In 2019, wind energy represented 9% of the energy generated in the country. In 2019, it was estimated that the country had an estimated wind power generation potential of around 522 GW (this, only onshore), enough energy to meet three times the country's current demand. In 2021 Brazil was the 7th country in the world in terms of installed wind power (21 GW), and the 4th largest producer of wind energy in the world (72 TWh), behind only China, USA and Germany.

Nuclear energy accounts for about 4% of Brazil's electricity. The nuclear power generation monopoly is owned by Eletronuclear (Eletrobrás Eletronuclear S/A), a wholly owned subsidiary of Eletrobrás. Nuclear energy is produced by two reactors at Angra. It is located at the Central Nuclear Almirante Álvaro Alberto (CNAAA) on the Praia de Itaorna in Angra dos Reis, Rio de Janeiro. It consists of two pressurized water reactors, Angra I, with capacity of 657 MW, connected to the power grid in 1982, and Angra II, with capacity of 1,350 MW, connected in 2000. A third reactor, Angra III, with a projected output of 1,350 MW, is planned to be finished.

 according to ONS, total installed capacity of photovoltaic solar was 21 GW, with average capacity factor of 23%. Some of the most irradiated Brazilian States are MG ("Minas Gerais"), BA ("Bahia") and GO (Goiás), which have indeed world irradiation level records. In 2019, solar power represented 1.27% of the energy generated in the country. In 2021, Brazil was the 14th country in the world in terms of installed solar power (13 GW), and the 11th largest producer of solar energy in the world (16.8 TWh).

In 2020, Brazil was the 2nd largest country in the world in the production of energy through biomass (energy production from solid biofuels and renewable waste), with 15,2 GW installed.

Other countries
After Brazil, Mexico is the country in Latin America that most stands out in energy production. In 2020, the country was the 14th largest petroleum producer in the world, and in 2018 it was the 12th largest exporter. In natural gas, the country was, in 2015, the 21st largest producer in the world, and in 2007 it was the 29th largest exporter. Mexico was also the world's 24th largest producer of coal in 2018. In renewable energies, in 2020, the country ranked 14th in the world in terms of installed wind energy (8.1 GW), 20th in the world in terms of installed solar energy (5.6 GW) and 19th in the world in terms of installed hydroelectric power (12.6 GW). In third place, Colombia stands out: In 2020, the country was the 20th largest petroleum producer in the world, and in 2015 it was the 19th largest exporter. In natural gas, the country was, in 2015, the 40th largest producer in the world. Colombia's biggest highlight is in coal, where the country was, in 2018, the world's 12th largest producer and the 5th largest exporter. In renewable energies, in 2020, the country ranked 45th in the world in terms of installed wind energy (0.5 GW), 76th in the world in terms of installed solar energy (0.1 GW) and 20th in the world in terms of installed hydroelectric power (12.6 GW). Venezuela, which was one of the world's largest oil producers (about 2.5 million barrels/day in 2015) and one of the largest exporters, due to its political problems, has had its production drastically reduced in recent years: in 2016, it dropped to 2.2 million, in 2017 to 2 million, in 2018 to 1.4 million and in 2019 to 877 thousand, reaching only 300,000 barrels/day at a given point. The country also stands out in hydroelectricity, where it was the 14th country in the world in terms of installed capacity in 2020 (16,5 GW). Argentina was, in 2017, the 18th largest producer in the world, and the largest producer in Latin America, of natural gas, in addition to being the 28th largest oil producer; although the country has the Vaca Muerta field, which holds close to 16 billion barrels of technically recoverable shale oil, and is the second largest shale natural gas deposit in the world, the country lacks the capacity to exploit the deposit: it is necessary capital, technology and knowledge that can only come from offshore energy companies, who view Argentina and its erratic economic policies with considerable suspicion, not wanting to invest in the country. In renewable energies, in 2020, the country ranked 27th in the world in terms of installed wind energy (2.6 GW), 42nd in the world in terms of installed solar energy (0.7 GW) and 21st in the world in terms of installed hydroelectric power (11.3 GW). The country has great future potential for the production of wind energy in the Patagonia region. Chile, although currently not a major energy producer, has great future potential for solar energy production in the Atacama Desert region. Paraguay stands out today in hydroelectric production thanks to the Itaipu Power Plant. Trinidad and Tobago and Bolivia stand out in the production of natural gas, where they were, respectively, the 20th and 31st largest in the world in 2015. Ecuador, because it consumes little energy, is part of OPEC and was the 27th largest oil producer in the world in 2020, being the 22nd largest exporter in 2014.

Trade blocs

The major trade blocs (or agreements) in the region are the Pacific Alliance and Mercosur. Minor blocs or trade agreements are the G3 Free Trade Agreement, the Dominican Republic – Central America Free Trade Agreement (DR-CAFTA), the Caribbean Community (CARICOM) and the Andean Community of Nations (CAN). However, major reconfigurations are taking place along opposing approaches to integration and trade; Venezuela has officially withdrawn from both the CAN and G3 and it has been formally admitted into the Mercosur (pending ratification from the Paraguayan legislature). The president-elect of Ecuador has manifested his intentions of following the same path. This bloc nominally opposes any Free Trade Agreement (FTA) with the United States, although Uruguay has manifested its intention otherwise. Chile, Peru, Colombia and Mexico are the only four Latin American nations that have an FTA with the United States and Canada, both members of the North American Free Trade Agreement (NAFTA).

China 
China's economic influence in Latin America increased substantially in the 21st century. Imports from China valued $8.3B in 2000, but by 2019, its value was $184.2B and had grown to be the region's largest trading partner. In particular, many of the investments are related to the Belt and Road Initiative or energy. China has also provided loans to several Latin American countries; this has raised concerns about the possibility of "debt traps." Specifically, Venezuela, Brazil, Ecuador, and Argentina received the most loans from China during 2005-2016.

Tourism

Income from tourism is key to the economy of several Latin American countries. Mexico is the only Latin American country to be ranked in the top 10 worldwide in the number of tourist visits. It received by far the largest number of international tourists, with 39.3 million visitors in 2017, followed by Argentina, with 6.7 million; then Brazil, with 6.6 million; Chile, with 6.5 million; Dominican Republic, with 6.2 million; Cuba with 4.3 million; Peru and Colombia with 4.0 million. The World Tourism Organization reports the following destinations as the top six tourism earners for the year 2017: Mexico, with US$21,333 million; the Dominican Republic, with US$7,178 million; Brazil, with US$6,024 million; Colombia, with US$4,773 million; Argentina, with US$4,687 million; and Panama, with US$4,258 million.

Places such as Cancún, Riviera Maya, Chichen Itza, Cabo San Lucas, Mexico City, Acapulco, Puerto Vallarta, Guanajuato City, San Miguel de Allende, Guadalajara in Mexico, Punta Cana, Santo Domingo in Dominican Republic, Punta del Este in Uruguay, Labadee in Haiti, San Juan, Ponce in Puerto Rico, Panama City in Panama, Poás Volcano National Park in Costa Rica, Viña del Mar in Chile, Rio de Janeiro, Florianópolis, Iguazu Falls, São Paulo, Armação dos Búzios, Salvador, Bombinhas, Angra dos Reis, Balneário Camboriú, Paraty, Ipojuca, Natal, Cairu, Fortaleza and Itapema in Brazil; Buenos Aires, Bariloche, Salta, Jujuy, Perito Moreno Glacier, Valdes Peninsula, Guarani Jesuit Missions in the cities of Misiones and Corrientes, Ischigualasto Provincial Park, Ushuaia and Patagonia in Argentina;
Isla Margarita, Angel Falls,  Los Roques archipelago, Gran Sabana in Venezuela; Machu Picchu,  Lima, Nazca Lines, Cuzco in Peru; Lake Titicaca, Salar de Uyuni, La Paz, Jesuit Missions of Chiquitos in Bolivia; Tayrona National Natural Park, Santa Marta, Bogotá, Cali, Medellín, Cartagena, San Andrés in Colombia, and the Galápagos Islands in Ecuador. are popular among international visitors in the region.

(*) Data for 2015 rather than 2017, as the newest data is currently unavailable.

Culture

Latin American culture is a mixture of many influences:

 Indigenous cultures of the people who inhabited the continent prior to European colonization. Ancient and advanced civilizations developed their own political, social and religious systems. The Maya, the Aztec and the Inca are examples of these. Indigenous legacies in music, dance, foods, arts and crafts, clothing, folk culture and traditions are strong in Latin America. Indigenous languages affected Spanish and Portuguese, giving rise to loanwords like pampa, taco, tamale, cacique.
 The culture of Europe was brought mainly by the colonial powersthe Spanish, Portuguese and Frenchbetween the 16th and 19th centuries. The most enduring European colonial influences are language and Catholicism. Additional cultural influences came from the United States and Europe during the 19th and 20th centuries, due to the growing influence of the former on the world stage and immigration from the latter. The influence of the United States is particularly strong in northern Latin America, especially Puerto Rico, which is an American territory. Prior to 1959, Cuba, which fought for its independence with American aid in the Spanish–American War, also had a close political and economic relationship with the United States. The United States also helped Panama become independent from Colombia and built the twenty-mile-long Panama Canal Zone in Panama, which it held from 1903 — the Panama Canal opened to transoceanic freight traffic in 1914 — to 1999, when the Torrijos-Carter Treaties restored Panamanian control of the Canal Zone. South America experienced waves of immigration of Europeans, especially Italians, Spaniards, Portuguese, Germans, Austrians, Poles, Ukrainians, French, Dutch, Russians, Croatians, Lithuanians, and Ashkenazi Jews. With the end of colonialism, French culture also exerted a direct influence in Latin America, especially in the realms of high culture, science and medicine. This can be seen in the region's artistic traditions, including painting, literature, and music, and in the realms of science and politics. 
 Due to the impact of Enlightenment ideals after the French revolution, a certain number of Iberian American countries decriminalized homosexuality after France and French territories in the Americas did so in 1791. Some of the countries that abolished sodomy laws or banned state interference in consensual adult sexuality in the 19th century were Dominican Republic (1822), Brazil (1824), Peru (1836), Mexico (1871), Paraguay (1880), Argentina (1887), Honduras (1899), Guatemala, and El Salvador. Today same-sex marriage is legal in Argentina, Brazil, Colombia, Costa Rica, Ecuador, Mexico, Uruguay, and French overseas departments. Civil unions can be held in Chile.
 African cultures, whose presence stems from a long history of the Atlantic slave trade. People of African descent have influenced the ethno-scapes of Latin America and the Caribbean. This is manifested for instance in music, dance and religion, especially in countries like Brazil, Puerto Rico, Venezuela, Colombia, Panama, Haiti, Honduras, Costa Rica, Dominican Republic, and Cuba.
 Asian cultures, whose part of the presence derives from the long history of the coolies who mostly arrived during the 19th and 20th centuries, most commonly Chinese workers in Peru and Venezuela, but also from Japanese and Korean immigration. especially headed to Brazil. This has greatly affected cuisine and other traditions including literature, art and lifestyles and politics. Asian influences have especially affected Brazil, Cuba, Panama and Peru.

Art

Beyond the tradition of Indigenous art, the development of Latin American visual art owed much to the influence of Spanish, Portuguese and French Baroque painting, which in turn often followed the trends of the Italians. In general, artistic Eurocentrism began to wane in the early twentieth century with the increased appreciation for indigenous forms of representation.

From the early twentieth century, the art of Latin America was greatly inspired by the Constructivist Movement. The movement rapidly spread from Russia to Europe and then into Latin America. Joaquín Torres García and Manuel Rendón have been credited with bringing the Constructivist Movement into Latin America from Europe.

An important artistic movement generated in Latin America is muralism represented by Diego Rivera, David Alfaro Siqueiros, José Clemente Orozco and Rufino Tamayo in Mexico, Santiago Martinez Delgado and Pedro Nel Gómez in Colombia and Antonio Berni in Argentina. Some of the most impressive Muralista works can be found in Mexico, Colombia, New York City, San Francisco, Los Angeles and Philadelphia.

Painter Frida Kahlo, one of the most famous Mexican artists, painted about her own life and the Mexican culture in a style combining Realism, Symbolism and Surrealism. Kahlo's work commands the highest selling price of all Latin American paintings.

The Venezuelan Armando Reverón, whose work begins to be recognized internationally, is one of the most important artists of the 20th century in South America; he is a precursor of Arte Povera and Happening. In the 60s kinetic art emerged in Venezuela. Its main representatives are Jesús Soto, Carlos Cruz-Diez, Alejandro Otero and Gego.

Colombian sculptor and painter Fernando Botero is also widely known for his works which, on first examination, are noted for their exaggerated proportions and the corpulence of the human and animal figures.

The Ecuadorian Oswaldo Guayasamín, considered one of the most important and seminal artists in Ecuador and South America. In his life, he made over 13,000 paintings and held more than 180 exhibitions all over the world, including Paris, Barcelona, New York, Buenos Aires, Moscow, Prague, and Rome. He brought his unique style of expressionism and cubism to the collection of Ecuador artwork during the Age of Anger which relates to the period of the Cold War when the United States opposed communist presence in South America. Social criticism of human and social inequality was central to his artwork.

Film

Latin American film is both rich and diverse. Historically, the main centers of production have been Mexico, Argentina, Brazil, and Cuba. Latin American film flourished after sound was introduced in cinema, which added a linguistic barrier to the export of Hollywood film south of the border.

Mexican cinema began in the silent era from 1896 to 1929 and flourished in the Golden Era of the 1940s. It boasted a huge industry comparable to Hollywood at the time, with stars such as María Félix, Dolores del Río, and Pedro Infante. In the 1970s, Mexico was the location for many cult horror and action movies. More recently, films such as Amores Perros (2000) and Y tu mamá también (2001) enjoyed box office and critical acclaim and propelled Alfonso Cuarón and Alejandro González Iñárritu to the front rank of Hollywood directors. Iñárritu in 2010 directed Biutiful and Birdman (2014), Alfonso Cuarón directed Harry Potter and the Prisoner of Azkaban in 2004 and Gravity in 2013. A close friend of both, Guillermo del Toro, a top rank Hollywood director in Hollywood and Spain, directed Pan's Labyrinth (2006) and produced El Orfanato (2007). Carlos Carrera (The Crime of Father Amaro), and screenwriter Guillermo Arriaga are also some of the best known modern Mexican film makers. Rudo y Cursi released in December (2008) in Mexico, was directed by Carlos Cuarón.

Argentine cinema has also been prominent since the first half of the 20th century and today averages over 60 full-length titles yearly. The industry suffered during the 1976–1983 military dictatorship; but re-emerged to produce the Academy Award winner The Official Story in 1985. A wave of imported US films again damaged the industry in the early 1990s, though it soon recovered, thriving even during the Argentine economic crisis around 2001. Many Argentine movies produced during recent years have been internationally acclaimed, including Nueve reinas (2000), Son of the Bride (2001), El abrazo partido (2004), El otro (2007), the 2010 Foreign Language Academy Award winner El secreto de sus ojos and Wild Tales (2014).

In Brazil, the Cinema Novo movement created a particular way of making movies with critical and intellectual screenplays, clearer photography related to the light of the outdoors in a tropical landscape, and a political message. The modern Brazilian film industry has become more profitable inside the country, and some of its productions have received prizes and recognition in Europe and the United States, with movies such as Central do Brasil (1999), Cidade de Deus (2002) and Tropa de Elite (2007).

Puerto Rican cinema has produced some notable films, such as Una Aventura Llamada Menudo, Los Diaz de Doris and Casi Casi. An influx of Hollywood films affected the local film industry in Puerto Rico during the 1980s and 1990s, but several Puerto Rican films have been produced since and it has been recovering.

Cuban cinema has enjoyed much official support since the Cuban revolution and important film-makers include Tomás Gutiérrez Alea.

Venezuelan television has also had a great impact in Latin America, is said that whilst "Venezuelan cinema began sporadically in the 1950s[, it] only emerged as a national-cultural movement in the mid-1970s" when it gained state support and auteurs could produce work. International co-productions with Latin America and Spain continued into this era and beyond, and Venezuelan films of this time were counted among the works of New Latin American Cinema. This period is known as Venezuela's Golden Age of cinema, having massive popularity even though it was a time of much social and political upheaval.

One of the most famous Venezuelan films, even to date, is the 1976 film Soy un delincuente by Clemente de la Cerda, which won the Special Jury Prize at the 1977 Locarno International Film Festival. Soy un delincuente was one of nine films for which the state gave substantial funding to produce, made in the year after the Venezuelan state began giving financial support to cinema in 1975. The support likely came from increased oil wealth in the early 1970s, and the subsequent 1973 credit incentive policy. At the time of its production the film was the most popular film in the country, and took a decade to be usurped from this position, even though it was only one in a string of films designed to tell social realist stories of struggle in the 1950s and '60s. Equally famous is the 1977 film El Pez que Fuma (Román Chalbaud). In 1981 FONCINE (the Venezuelan Film Fund) was founded, and this year it provided even more funding to produce seventeen feature films. A few years later in 1983 with Viernes Negro, oil prices dropped and Venezuela entered a depression which prevented such extravagant funding, but film production continued; more transnational productions occurred, many more with Spain due to Latin America's poor economic fortune in general, and there was some in new cinema, as well: Fina Torres' 1985 Oriana won the Caméra d'Or Prize at the 1985 Cannes Film Festival as the best first feature. Film production peaked in 1984–5,:37 with 1986 considered Venezuelan cinema's most successful year by the state, thanks to over 4 million admissions to national films, according to Venezuelanalysis. The Venezuelan capital of Caracas hosted the Ibero-American Forum on Cinematography Integration in 1989, from which the pan-continental IBERMEDIA was formed; a union which provides regional funding.

Literature

Pre-Columbian cultures were primarily oral, although the Aztecs and Maya, for instance, produced elaborate codices. Oral accounts of mythological and religious beliefs were also sometimes recorded after the arrival of European colonizers, as was the case with the Popol Vuh. Moreover, a tradition of oral narrative survives to this day, for instance among the Quechua-speaking population of Peru and the Quiché (K'iche') of Guatemala.

From the very moment of Europe's discovery of the continents, early explorers and conquistadores produced written accounts and crónicas of their experiencesuch as Columbus's letters or Bernal Díaz del Castillo's description of the conquest of Mexico. During the colonial period, written culture was often in the hands of the church, within which context Sor Juana Inés de la Cruz wrote memorable poetry and philosophical essays. Towards the end of the 18th century and the beginning of the 19th, a distinctive criollo literary tradition emerged, including the first novels such as Lizardi's El Periquillo Sarniento (1816).

The 19th century was a period of "foundational fictions" in critic Doris Sommer's words, novels in the Romantic or Naturalist traditions that attempted to establish a sense of national identity, and which often focussed on the Indigenous question or the dichotomy of "civilization or barbarism" (for which see, say, Domingo Sarmiento's Facundo (1845), Juan León Mera's Cumandá (1879), or Euclides da Cunha's Os Sertões (1902)). The 19th century also witnessed the realist work of Machado de Assis, who made use of surreal devices of metaphor and playful narrative construction, much admired by critic Harold Bloom.

At the turn of the 20th century, modernismo emerged, a poetic movement whose founding text was Nicaraguan poet Rubén Darío's Azul (1888). This was the first Latin American literary movement to influence literary culture outside of the region, and was also the first truly Latin American literature, in that national differences were no longer so much at issue. José Martí, for instance, though a Cuban patriot, also lived in Mexico and the United States and wrote for journals in Argentina and elsewhere.

However, what really put Latin American literature on the global map was no doubt the literary boom of the 1960s and 1970s, distinguished by daring and experimental novels (such as Julio Cortázar's Rayuela (1963)) that were frequently published in Spain and quickly translated into English. The Boom's defining novel was Gabriel García Márquez's Cien años de soledad (1967), which led to the association of Latin American literature with magic realism, though other important writers of the period such as the Peruvian Mario Vargas Llosa and Carlos Fuentes do not fit so easily within this framework. Arguably, the Boom's culmination was Augusto Roa Bastos's monumental Yo, el supremo (1974). In the wake of the Boom, influential precursors such as Juan Rulfo, Alejo Carpentier, and above all Jorge Luis Borges were also rediscovered.

Contemporary literature in the region is vibrant and varied, ranging from the best-selling Paulo Coelho and Isabel Allende to the more avant-garde and critically acclaimed work of writers such as Diamela Eltit, Giannina Braschi, Ricardo Piglia, or Roberto Bolaño. There has also been considerable attention paid to the genre of testimonio, texts produced in collaboration with subaltern subjects such as Rigoberta Menchú. Finally, a new breed of chroniclers is represented by the more journalistic Carlos Monsiváis and Pedro Lemebel.

The region boasts six Nobel Prize winners: in addition to the two Chilean poets Gabriela Mistral (1945) and Pablo Neruda (1971), there is also the Guatemalan novelist Miguel Ángel Asturias (1967), the Colombian writer Gabriel García Márquez (1982), the Mexican poet and essayist Octavio Paz (1990), and the Peruvian novelist Mario Vargas Llosa (2010).

Music and dance

Latin America has produced many successful worldwide artists in terms of recorded global music sales. Among the most successful have been Juan Gabriel (Mexico) only Latin American musician to have sold over 200 million records worldwide, Gloria Estefan (Cuba), Carlos Santana, Luis Miguel (Mexico) of whom have sold over 90 million records, Shakira (Colombia) and Vicente Fernández (Mexico) with over 50 million records sold worldwide. Enrique Iglesias, although not a Latin American, has also contributed for the success of Latin music.

Other notable successful mainstream acts through the years, include RBD, Celia Cruz, Soda Stereo, Thalía, Ricky Martin, Maná, Marc Anthony, Ricardo Arjona, Selena, and Menudo.

Latin Caribbean music, such as merengue, bachata, salsa, and more recently reggaeton, from such countries as the Dominican Republic, Puerto Rico, Cuba, and Panama, has been strongly influenced by African rhythms and melodies. Haiti's compas is a genre of music that is influenced by its Latin Caribbean counterparts, along with elements of jazz and modern sounds.

Another well-known Latin American musical genre includes the Argentine and Uruguayan tango (with Carlos Gardel as the greatest exponent), as well as the distinct nuevo tango, a fusion of tango, acoustic and electronic music popularized by bandoneón virtuoso Ástor Piazzolla. Samba, North American jazz, European classical music and choro combined to form bossa nova in Brazil, popularized by guitarist João Gilberto with singer Astrud Gilberto and pianist Antonio Carlos Jobim.

Other influential Latin American sounds include the Antillean soca and calypso, the Honduran (Garifuna) punta, the Colombian cumbia and vallenato, the Chilean cueca, the Ecuadorian boleros, and rockoleras, the Mexican ranchera and the mariachi which is the epitome of Mexican soul, the Nicaraguan palo de Mayo, the Peruvian marinera and tondero, the Uruguayan candombe, the French Antillean zouk (derived from Haitian compas) and the various styles of music from pre-Columbian traditions that are widespread in the Andean region.

The classical composer Heitor Villa-Lobos (1887–1959) worked on the recording of Native musical traditions within his homeland of Brazil. The traditions of his homeland heavily influenced his classical works. Also notable is the recent work of the Cuban Leo Brouwer, Uruguayan-American Miguel del Águila, guitar works of the Venezuelan Antonio Lauro and the Paraguayan Agustín Barrios. Latin America has also produced world-class classical performers such as the Chilean pianist Claudio Arrau, Brazilian pianist Nelson Freire and the Argentine pianist and conductor Daniel Barenboim. Brazilian opera soprano Bidu Sayão, one of Brazil's most famous musicians, was a leading artist of the Metropolitan Opera in New York City from 1937 to 1952.

Arguably, the main contribution to music entered through folklore, where the true soul of the Latin American and Caribbean countries is expressed. Musicians such as Yma Súmac, Chabuca Granda, Atahualpa Yupanqui, Violeta Parra, Víctor Jara, Jorge Cafrune, Facundo Cabral, Mercedes Sosa, Jorge Negrete, Luiz Gonzaga, Caetano Veloso, Susana Baca, Chavela Vargas, Simon Diaz, Julio Jaramillo, Toto la Momposina, Gilberto Gil, Maria Bethânia, Nana Caymmi, Nara Leão, Gal Costa, Ney Matogrosso as well as musical ensembles such as Inti Illimani and Los Kjarkas are magnificent examples of the heights that this soul can reach.

Latin pop, including many forms of rock, is popular in Latin America today (see Spanish language rock and roll). A few examples are Café Tacuba, Soda Stereo, Maná, Los Fabulosos Cadillacs, Rita Lee, Mutantes, Secos e Molhados Legião Urbana, Titãs, Paralamas do Sucesso, Cazuza, Barão Vermelho, Skank, Miranda!, Cansei de Ser Sexy or CSS, and Bajo Fondo.

More recently, reggaeton, which blends Jamaican reggae and dancehall with Latin America genres such as bomba and plena, as well as hip hop, is becoming more popular, in spite of the controversy surrounding its lyrics, dance steps (Perreo) and music videos. It has become very popular among populations with a "migrant culture" influence – both Latino populations in the United States, such as southern Florida and New York City, and parts of Latin America where migration to the United States is common, such as Trinidad and Tobago, Dominican Republic, Colombia, Ecuador, El Salvador, and Mexico.

World Heritage Sites
The following is a list of the ten countries with the most UNESCO World Heritage Sites in Latin America.

See also 

Americas (terminology)
Anglo-America
Euro-Latin American Parliamentary Assembly
French America
Hispanic America
Hispanic and Latino Americans
Ibero-America
Indigenous peoples of the Americas (Amerindians)
Inter-American Treaty of Reciprocal Assistance
Latin America and the Caribbean
Latin America and the League of Nations
Latin America–United States relations
Latin American diaspora
Latin American integration
Latin American studies
Latin American Studies Association
Latin Americans
List of Latin Americans
Mesoamerica
Organization of American States
Pan-American Conferences
Pan-Americanism

Notes

References

Further reading 

 Alonso, Paul. Digital Humor as Cultural Globalization in Latin America. Internet, Humor, and Nation in Latin/x America, 2022.
 Ardao, Arturo. Génesis de la idea y nombre de América Latina. Caracas: Centro de Estudios Latinoamericanos Rómulo Gallegos, 1980.
 Ayala Mora, Enrique. "El origen del nombre América Latina y la tradición católica del siglo XIX." Anuario Colombiano de Historia Social y de la Cultura 40, no. 1 (2013), 213–41.
 Berryman, Phillip. Latin America at 200. Austin: University of Texas Press 2016.
 Bethell, Leslie, The Cambridge History of Latin America. 12 volumes. Cambridge: Cambridge University Press 1985–2008.
 Bomfim, Manoel. A América latina: Males de origem. Rio de Janeiro: H. Garnier 1905.
 Braudel, Fernand. "Y a-t-il une Amérique latine?" Annales ESC 3 (1948), 467–71.
 Calderón, Fernando and Manuel Castells. The New Latin America. Cambridge: Polity Press 2020.
 Coatsworth, John H., and Alan M. Taylor, eds. Latin America and the World Economy Since 1800. Cambridge MA: Harvard University Press 1998.
 Edwards, Sebastián. Left Behind: Latin America and the False Promise of Populism. University of Chicago Press, 2010.
 
 Galeano, Eduardo. Open Veins of Latin America: Five Centuries of the Pillage of a Continent. 1973
 Gobat, Michel, "The Invention of Latin America: A Transnational History of Anti-Imperialism, Democracy, and Race," American Historical Review Vol. 118, no. 3 (December 2013), pp. 1345–1375.
 Halperin Donghi, Tulio. The Contemporary History of Latin America. Durham: Duke University Press 1993. 
 Lockhart, James and Stuart B. Schwartz. Early Latin America. Cambridge: Cambridge University Press 1982.
 Martínez Estrada, Ezequiel. Diferencias y semejanzas entre los países de América Latina. Mexico" Universidad Nacional Autónoma de México 1962.
 Maurer Queipo, Isabel (ed.): "Directory of World Cinema: Latin America", intellectbooks, Bristol 2013, 
 Mazzuca, Sebastián, Latecomer State Formation: Political Geography and Capacity Failure in Latin America. New Haven, CT: Yale University Press, 2021.
 McGinnes, Aims.  "Searching for 'Latin America': Race and Sovereignty in the Americas in the 1850s." In Race and Nation in Modern Latin America, edited by Nancy P. Appelbaum, Anne S. Macpherson, and Karin alejandra Rosemblatt. Chapel Hill: University of North Carolina Press 2003, pp, 87–107.
 Mignolo, Walter, The Idea of Latin America. Oxford: Wiley-Blackwell 2005.
 Moraña, Mabel, Enrique Dussel, and Carlos A. Jáuregui, eds. Coloniality at Large: Latin America and the Postcolonial Debate. Durham: Duke University Press 2008.
 Phelan, John Leddy. (1968). Pan-latinisms, French Intervention in Mexico (1861–1867) and the Genesis of the Idea of Latin America. Mexico City: Universidad Nacional Autonónoma de México 1968.
 Tenenbaum, Barbara A. ed. Encyclopedia of Latin American History and Culture. 5 vols. New York:  Charles Scribner's Sons 1996
 Tenorio-Trillo, Mauricio. Latin America: The Allure and Power of an Idea. Chicago: University of Chicago Press 2017. 
 Vasconcelos, José. Indología: Una interpretación de la cultura ibero-americana. Barcelona: Agencia Mundial de Librería 1927.
 Zea, Leopoldo, ed. Fuentes de la cultura latinoamericana. 2 vols. Mexico City: Fondo de Cultura Económica 1993.

External links 

 IDB Education Initiative
 Latin American, Caribbean, U.S. Latinx, and Iberian Online Free E-Resources (LACLI). 
 Latin American Network Information Center 
 Latin America Data Base 
 Washington Office on Latin America
 Council on Hemispheric Affairs
 Codigos De Barra
 
 Map of Land Cover: Latin America and Caribbean (FAO) 
 Lessons From Latin America by Benjamin Dangl, The Nation, March 4, 2009
 
 
 Latin America Cold War Resources, Yale University
 Latin America Cold War, Harvard University
 Latin American Research Centre, University of Calgary
 The war on Democracy, by John Pilger

 
Country classifications